= European Union Ethics Body =

The European Union Ethics Body is the result of a binding interinstitutional agreement published in 2024. The political commitment appears in the 2019–2024 cycle, when European Commission President Ursula von der Leyen pledged support for a common ethics body and tasked Vice-President Věra Jourová with advancing it, alongside sustained parliamentary pressure for an "independent" ethics authority.

"With the establishment of the Ethics Body, there will, for the first time, be common standards for the ethical conduct of members and a formal mechanism for coordination and exchange of views on ethical requirements among institutions. Thanks to these changes, EU politicians will be subject to common, clear, transparent and understandable standards."

— European Commission press release

After the European Commission tabled its proposal on 8 June 2023 (COM(2023)311), negotiations produced an Agreement that the European Parliament approved on 25 April 2024, and that was published in the Official Journal as OJ L 2024/1365 on 17 May 2024, with entry into force twenty days after publication.

"Democracy can thrive only if citizens trust their institutions. [...] Therefore, I call on our partners [...] to swiftly support the proposal for an Ethics Body. We need to develop and apply common clear, comprehensible and transparent standards for all the European institutions."

— Věra Jourová, former Vice-President of the European Commission for Values and Transparency.

== Historical context ==
For much of its institutional history, the European Union operated under a predominantly decentralised and self-regulatory model of ethical governance (see European Parliament Research Service briefing on the topic, section "Fragmented EU ethics framework"). Each institution – the European Commission, the European Parliament, and the Council – developed and enforced its own rules of conduct without a coordinated supervisory framework. While this arrangement reflected the principle of institutional autonomy embedded in Article 13 TEU, it progressively revealed structural weaknesses. A succession of high-profile controversies exposed the fragmentation of the EU’s ethical architecture, the absence of independent oversight, and the limited enforceability of ethical norms.

As Alberto Alemanno has observed, the EU public integrity system evolved incrementally and reactively, largely as a response to scandals rather than through comprehensive institutional design. The resulting framework remained fragmented, weakly enforced, and highly dependent on internal compliance mechanisms rather than external scrutiny. Similarly, the European Court of Auditors concluded in its 2019 Special Report (see section "There are areas for harmonisation and examples of good practice in the ethical frameworks of the audited institutions", page 24 onwards) that the ethical frameworks of the EU institutions suffered from significant fragmentation and insufficient enforcement mechanisms.

Perhaps the most symbolically powerful episode was the appointment of José Manuel Barroso, former President of the Commission, as Chairman of Goldman Sachs International in 2016. The move reignited concerns over "revolving doors" – the transition of senior EU officials into corporate positions potentially linked to their former responsibilities. Corporate Europe Observatory commented on this move calling it a "dangerous liaison".

Although the Commission’s Ad Hoc Ethical Committee concluded that Barroso had not formally breached the applicable Code of Conduct, the episode triggered significant political and public backlash. It exposed the limitations of the cooling-off regime, which at the time imposed an 18-month notification period but did not prohibit certain post-mandate activities.

Subsequent reforms extended the cooling-off period to two years for Commissioners and three years for the Commission President. However, as highlighted in recent doctrinal analysis from Alberto Alemanno, these reforms remained essentially procedural rather than structural, preserving institutional self-assessment as the primary enforcement model.

== The Body ==
Daniel Freund, while working at Transparency International, asked lead candidates ahead of the 2019 European Parliament election to support an Ethics Body. When Ursula von der Leyen became the Commission President candidate for the EPP, she promised the Greens she would back the Ethics Body in her opening speech. Freund, as Member of the European Parliament, wrote the report, got it adopted as rapporteur, and negotiated the Interinstitutional Agreement with Katarina Barley and Salvatore De Meo. Alberto Alemanno's initial study was partly commissioned by the Greens.

The 2024 interinstitutional agreement establishing the Interinstitutional Body for Ethical Standards was adopted on the basis of Article 295 TFEU, which allows EU institutions to make arrangements for their cooperation. The Commission’s proposal presented the initiative as addressing the absence of "common minimum ethical standards" for members of EU institutions while respecting institutional autonomy.

Under the agreement, the Body is tasked with developing and updating common minimum standards in specified areas, including declarations of interests, gifts and hospitality, external activities during and after the mandate, and transparency obligations. Institutions must assess the alignment of their internal rules with these standards and participate in exchanges of views within the Body.

The agreement provides that the Body does not exercise investigative or disciplinary powers and must not affect the competences or internal organisation of the participating institutions. Application of ethics rules to individual cases remains the responsibility of each institution in accordance with its own procedures. Independent experts may be consulted by a participating institution on questions relating to declarations or interpretation of standards, but their opinions are advisory.

The Body is composed of one representative from each participating institution and acts by consensus. A joint secretariat is formally hosted by the European Commission. The agreement also specifies that it does not apply to national ministers sitting in the Council, who remain subject to national rules, as stated in the political declaration adopted by Member States meeting within the Council.

== Implementation challenges ==
As adopted, the Agreement establishes a formal framework of cooperation among the European Parliament, the Council of the European Union, the Commission, the ECB, the Court of Auditors, the EESC and the Committee of the Regions, with the Court of Justice participating only as an observer to safeguard judicial independence, and with the European Investment Bank allowed to join later on request.

Its core objective is not to create a supranational ethics prosecutor, but to develop common minimum standards for members and to institutionalise a structured mechanism for coordination and exchange of views on ethical requirements, based on self-assessments and consultation of independent experts.

"The Body shall contribute to promoting a common culture of ethics and transparency amongst the Parties, in particular by developing common minimum standards and by fostering the exchange of best practices on the matter."

— Article 6, paragraph 1. of the Interinstitutional Agreement

At the same time, the Body’s limited mandate as described by Alberto Alemanno – no autonomous investigative powers and no power to impose sanctions – reflects the political compromises underpinning the Agreement.

"As a result of this divergent reading of the existing EU public integrity system, the Body proposed by the EU Commission [...] appears unable, at least prima facie, to overcome the structural limitations characterising the existing 'EU ethical infrastructure.' [...] Contrary to what the EU Parliament had originally called for the Body's scope ratione personae is limited to members of the EU institutions and not – as the Parliament’s resolutions called for – the EU career staff."

There are additional concerns about institutional autonomy under Article 13 TEU and the Council’s position that national ministers sitting in Council remain governed primarily by national ethical frameworks.

"The agreement seeks to establish a framework for cooperation between six institutions and two bodies (see above). The European Investment Bank may join the agreement voluntarily (Article 1), while the European Council is not part of the agreement. The ECJ, signatory of the agreement, will participate only as an observer in order to preserve its impartiality, since the Court might be called on to decide on the validity of common rules agreed within the IBES, which might put the Court in a position of conflict of interest."

Despite its formal entry into force in May 2024, the Ethics Body has, to date, not been fully operationalised, as key implementation steps – most notably the appointment of independent experts and the internal procedural adaptations within the European Parliament – have been delayed or blocked, preventing the Body from effectively commencing its substantive work.

Implementation of the interinstitutional ethics body has been debated within the European Parliament. In Parliament’s press material on the agreement, Daniel Freund (Greens/EFA) argued that the new body would strengthen enforcement and independent checks compared with "self-control". The Greens/EFA group also presented the body as a first step to improve integrity and address issues such as lobbying and revolving doors.

The EPP Group has criticised the design of the ethics body in public statements. In June 2023, Sven Simon (EPP) warned of a risk of politicisation and argued that such a body would not have prevented abuses such as Qatargate. In an April 2024 plenary debate, Simon described the agreement as a "frontal attack" on the independence of elected Members.

Several implementation steps became contentious after the agreement entered into force, including financial and procedural measures linked to participation in the Ethics Body. In March 2025, the Committee on Budgetary Control (CONT) rejected Parliament’s discharge report after an amendment was adopted calling for withholding funding for the Ethics Body pending changes in the internal rules of procedure of the European Parliament.

The European Parliament's 2025 budget discharge procedure was characterized by an unprecedented institutional deadlock regarding the operationalization of the independent EU Ethics Body. In March 2025, the Committee on Budgetary Control (CONT) took the historic step of rejecting the Parliament's own discharge report after an amendment by the EPP group sought to freeze funding for the body, as Transparency International EU reports.

While the general discharge for the 2023 financial year was eventually granted on 7 May 2025, the political impasse deepened on 14 May 2025, when a coalition of center-right and right-wing MEPs blocked the necessary updates to the Parliament’s Rules of Procedure. This resistance prevented the body from exercising oversight within the institution despite the 2024 interinstitutional agreement. MEP Daniel Freund (Greens/EFA) criticised this position in a press briefing on 13 May 2025. According to Thomas Wahl, researcher in EU law at the Max Planck Institute for the Study of Crime, Security and Law (MPI CSL), this opposition, led by the EPP group, aimed to preserve parliamentary autonomy from external control, leaving the institution without an independent ethical monitoring mechanism for the remainder of the legislature.

The continued stalemate led to the registration of a European Citizens' Initiative in January 2026, which aimed to bypass the legislative hurdle by demanding mandatory transparency and integrity standards for all EU political entities.

== See also ==
- Qatar corruption scandal at the European Parliament
