= European Parliament Committee on Constitutional Affairs =

European Parliament committee

Committee on Constitutional Affairs
- Abbreviation: AFCO
- Type: Standing committee
- Legislature: European Parliament
- Parliamentary term: 10th European Parliament
- Chair: Sven Simon; EPP, Germany
- Vice-Chairs: Gabriele Bischoff (S&D); Adrián Vázquez Lázara (EPP); Charles Goerens (Renew)
- Members: 30
- Political composition: EPP: 9 · S&D: 6 · ECR: 3 · Renew: 3 PfE: 4 · Greens/EFA: 2 · The Left: 2 · ESN: 1
- Established: 1982
- Jurisdiction: Institutional reform, EU treaties, interinstitutional relations, electoral law, European political parties and Parliament's Rules of Procedure
- Website: Official website

The Committee on Constitutional Affairs (AFCO) is a standing committee of the European Parliament. It deals with the institutional aspects of European integration, including the implementation and amendment of the Treaties of the European Union, interinstitutional relations, the European electoral procedure, European political parties and foundations, and the interpretation and application of Parliament's Rules of Procedure. It was established in 1982 as the Committee on Institutional Affairs.

== Responsibilities ==
The committee is responsible for the institutional aspects of the European integration process, particularly the preparation, initiation and conduct of procedures for amending the Treaties. It also examines the institutional consequences of enlargement negotiations and proposals concerning the constitutional development of the European Union.

Its remit includes:

- implementation of the Treaties and assessment of their operation;
- interinstitutional relations, including agreements between the institutions;
- Parliament's Rules of Procedure and proposals for their amendment;
- the European electoral procedure and the verification of members' credentials;
- the statute and funding of European political parties and European political foundations;
- Parliament's role in the appointment or election of office-holders in the institutions of the European Union;
- institutional consequences of enlargement negotiations; and
- the determination of whether there is a serious and persistent breach by a member state of the values on which the European Union is founded.

The committee also maintains relations with national parliaments and with bodies concerned with the institutional development of the European Union.

== Chairs ==
The following table lists the chairs of the committee since 1999.

Name	Political group	Member state	Took office	Left office
Giorgio Napolitano	PES	Italy	1999	2004
Jo Leinen	PES	Germany	2004	2009
Carlo Casini	EPP	Italy	2009	2014
Danuta Hübner	EPP	Poland	2014	2019
Antonio Tajani	EPP	Italy	2019	2022
Salvatore De Meo	EPP	Italy	2022	2024
Sven Simon	EPP	Germany	2024	Incumbent

== Members ==
=== 10th Parliament, 2024–2029 ===
The committee consists of 30 full members. Its current composition is shown below, with the chair and vice-chairs indicated in italics.

European People's Party	Progressive Alliance of Socialists and Democrats	European Conservatives and Reformists	Renew Europe
Sven Simon, Germany, Chair; Adrián Vázquez Lázara, Spain, Vice-Chair; François-Xavier Bellamy, France; Csaba Bogdán, Hungary; Salvatore De Meo, Italy; Emmanouil Kefalogiannis, Greece; Bartłomiej Sienkiewicz, Poland; Sabine Verheyen, Germany; Loránt Vincze, Romania	Gabriele Bischoff, Germany, Vice-Chair; Brando Benifei, Italy; Vasile Dîncu, Romania; Klára Dobrev, Hungary; Juan Fernando López Aguilar, Spain; Thijs Reuten, Netherlands	Patryk Jaki, Poland; Sander Smit, Netherlands; Charlie Weimers, Sweden	Charles Goerens, Luxembourg, Vice-Chair; Sandro Gozi, France; Ľubica Karvašová, Slovakia
Patriots for Europe	Greens–European Free Alliance	The Left	Europe of Sovereign Nations
Gerolf Annemans, Belgium; Jean-Paul Garraud, France; Ernő Schaller-Baross, Hungary; Alexandre Varaut, France	Daniel Freund, Germany; Reinier van Lanschot, Netherlands	Carolina Morace, Italy; Anthony Smith, France	Stanisław Tyszka, Poland

==== Substitute members ====
Substitute members of the 10th Parliament (click “show” to expand)

The committee's substitute members are listed below.

European People's Party	Progressive Alliance of Socialists and Democrats	European Conservatives and Reformists	Renew Europe
Sebastião Bugalho, Portugal; Alma Ezcurra Almansa, Spain; Kamila Gasiuk-Pihowicz, Poland; Borja Giménez Larraz, Spain; Willemien Koning, Netherlands; Liudas Mažylis, Lithuania; Ana Miguel Pedro, Portugal; Tomislav Sokol, Croatia	Vytenis Povilas Andriukaitis, Lithuania; Marc Angel, Luxembourg; Idoia Mendia, Spain; Krzysztof Śmiszek, Poland; Kristian Vigenin, Bulgaria; Alessandro Zan, Italy	Tobiasz Bocheński, Poland; Mario Mantovani, Italy; Gheorghe Piperea, Romania	Gilles Boyer, France; Helmut Brandstätter, Austria; Joachim Streit, Germany
Patriots for Europe	Greens–European Free Alliance	The Left	Europe of Sovereign Nations
Marieke Ehlers, Netherlands; Juan Carlos Girauta Vidal, Spain; Fabrice Leggeri, France; Harald Vilimsky, Austria	Damian Boeselager, Germany; Leoluca Orlando, Italy	Pasquale Tridico, Italy	Christine Anderson, Germany

== Research support ==
The committee's work is supported by the research services of the European Parliament. These services provide studies, briefings and other analyses concerning institutional reform, treaty change, electoral law, democratic accountability, interinstitutional relations and Parliament's internal rules.

Publications prepared for the committee are made available through its online database of supporting analyses and through the European Parliament's Think Tank.

== See also ==
- Treaties of the European Union
- Rules of Procedure of the European Parliament
- European political party
- European Parliament election
- Conference on the Future of Europe
- Conference of Parliamentary Committees for Union Affairs of Parliaments of the European Union
