= Gabriele Bischoff =

German politician

Gabriele Bischoff MEP
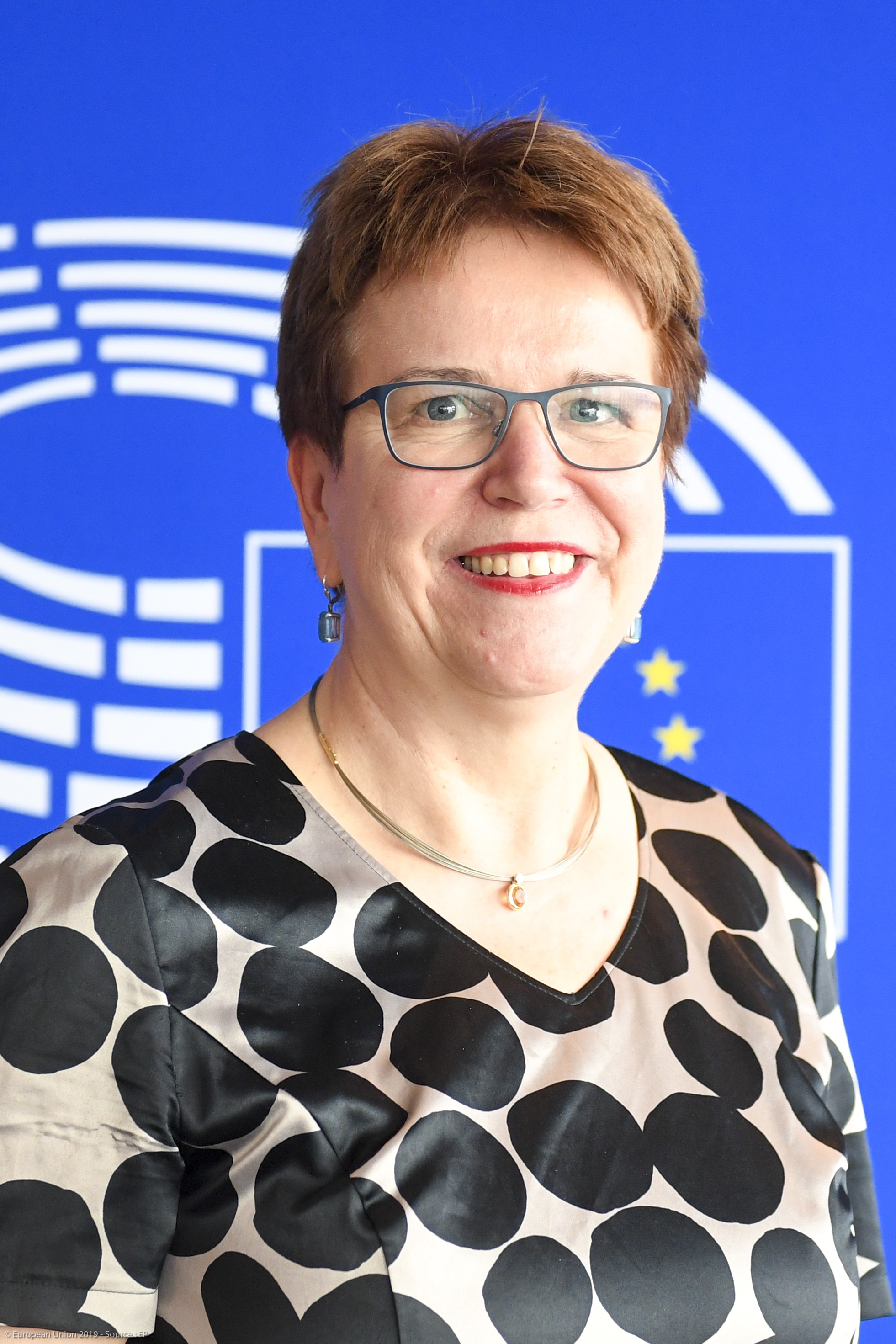

Member of the European Parliament for Germany

Personal details
- Born: 4 January 1961 (age 65) Bad Wildungen, West Germany
- Party: German: Social Democratic Party; EU: Party of European Socialists
- Education: University of Marburg; Free University of Berlin

Gabriele Bischoff (born 4 January 1961) is a German politician of the Social Democratic Party (SPD) who is serving as a Member of the European Parliament.

== Early life and education ==
Bischoff was born in Bad Wildungen and graduated from König-Heinrich-Gymnasium in Fritzlar in 1980. She then began studying political science and American studies at the University of Marburg, then moved to the Free University of Berlin, where she graduated with a diploma in political science.

== Career ==
From 1991 until 2000, Bischoff worked at Germany's largest trade union, IG Metall, on gender equality issues. In that capacity, she represented IG Metall in the relevant working groups of the European Trade Union Confederation (ETUC).

From 2000 to 2005, Bischoff worked as an advisor on social affairs at the Permanent Representation of Germany to the EU in Brussels before moving to the Federal Ministry of Labour and Social Affairs (BMAS) in Berlin as special advisor from 2006 to 2008.

From 2008 Bischoff worked for the German Trade Union Confederation (DGB) in Berlin, where she led the trade union's work on European policies. In that capacity, she was a member of the European Economic and Social Committee (EESC) in Brussels from 2009 until 2019. During her tenure, she served as president of the employees' group from 2015.

== Political career ==
Bischoff has been a Member of the European Parliament since the 2019 European elections. She has since been serving on the Committee on Constitutional Affairs and the Committee on Employment and Social Affairs. She is also a member of the Working Group on the Conference on the Future of Europe.

In addition to her committee assignments, Bischoff is part of the Parliament's delegation for relations with Mercosur. She is also a member of the Spinelli Group the European Parliament Intergroup on Trade Unions and the European Parliament Intergroup on LGBT Rights.

In the negotiations to form a so-called traffic light coalition of the SPD, the Green Party and the Free Democratic Party (FDP) following the 2021 federal elections, Bischoff was part of her party's delegation in the working group on European affairs, co-chaired by Udo Bullmann, Franziska Brantner and Nicola Beer.

Since 2021, Bischoff has been serving as vice-chair of the S&D Group, under the leadership of chairwoman Iratxe García.

In the negotiations to form a coalition government between the Christian Democratic Union (CDU) and the SPD under the leadership of Kai Wegner following Berlin’s 2023 state elections, Bischoff was part of her party’s delegation to the working group on European affairs. In similar negotiations to form a coalition government in Berlin under the prospective leadership of Elif Eralp following the 2026 state elections, she led her party's delegation in the working group on culture, media, European affairs, the metropolitan region and social cohesion.

== Other activities ==
- German Cyclist’s Association (ADFC)
