= Salvatore De Meo =

Italian politician

Salvatore De Meo MEP
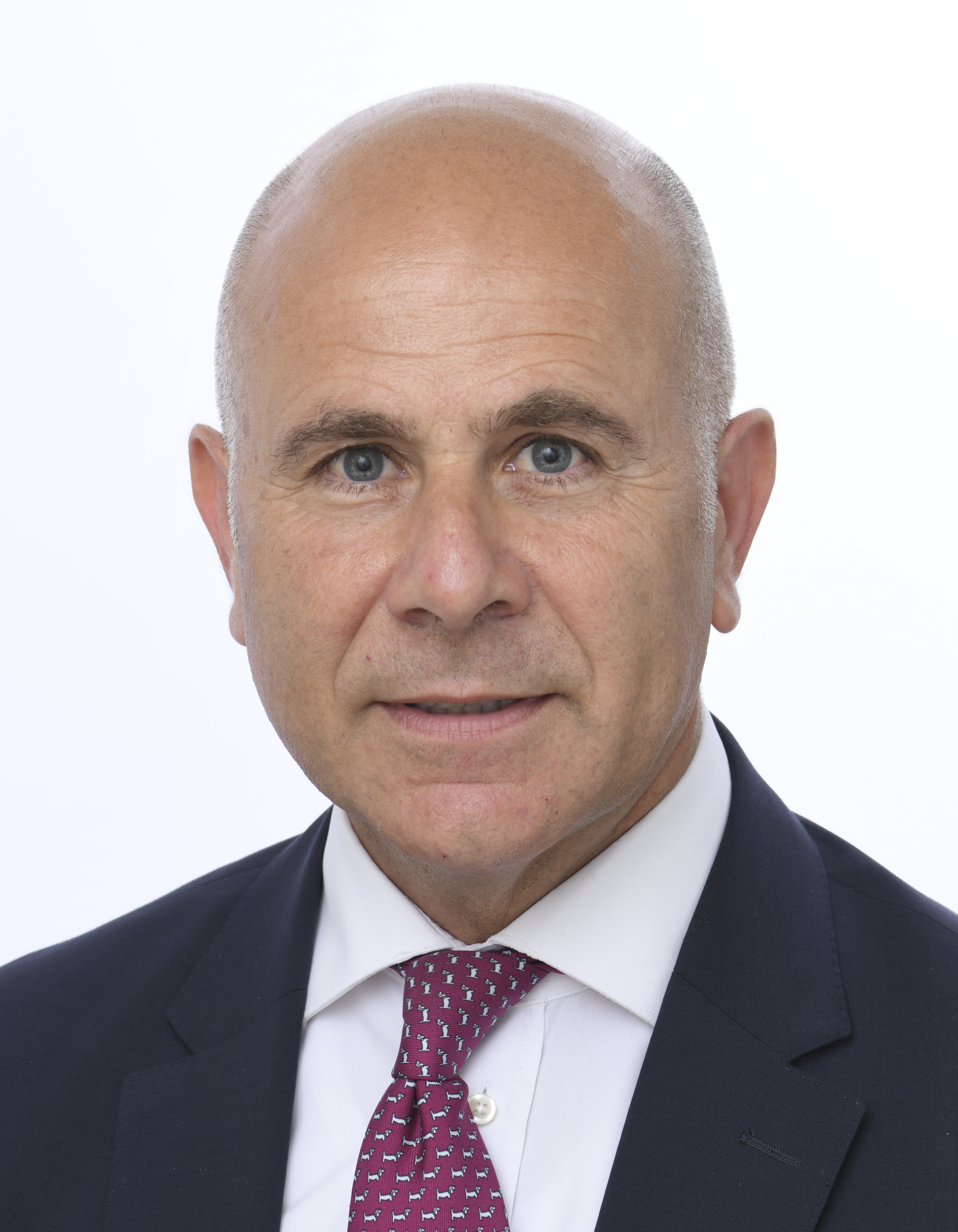

Member of the European Parliament for Central Italy
- Incumbent
- Assumed office 1 February 2020

Personal details
- Party: Forza Italia

Salvatore De Meo (born 27 October 1971 in Fondi) is an Italian politician who was elected as a member of the European Parliament in 2019. He took his seat after Brexit.

As of the end of 2022 he was the chairman of the European Parliament Committee on Constitutional Affairs (AFCO).

In March 2024, De Meo was one of twenty MEPs to be given a "Rising Star" award at The Parliament Magazine's annual MEP Awards.

In May 2025, President of the European Parliament Roberta Metsola requested that De Meo's parliamentary immunity be lifted with regard to a bribery investigation involving Huawei.
