= Sven Simon =

German law professor

Sven Simon MEP
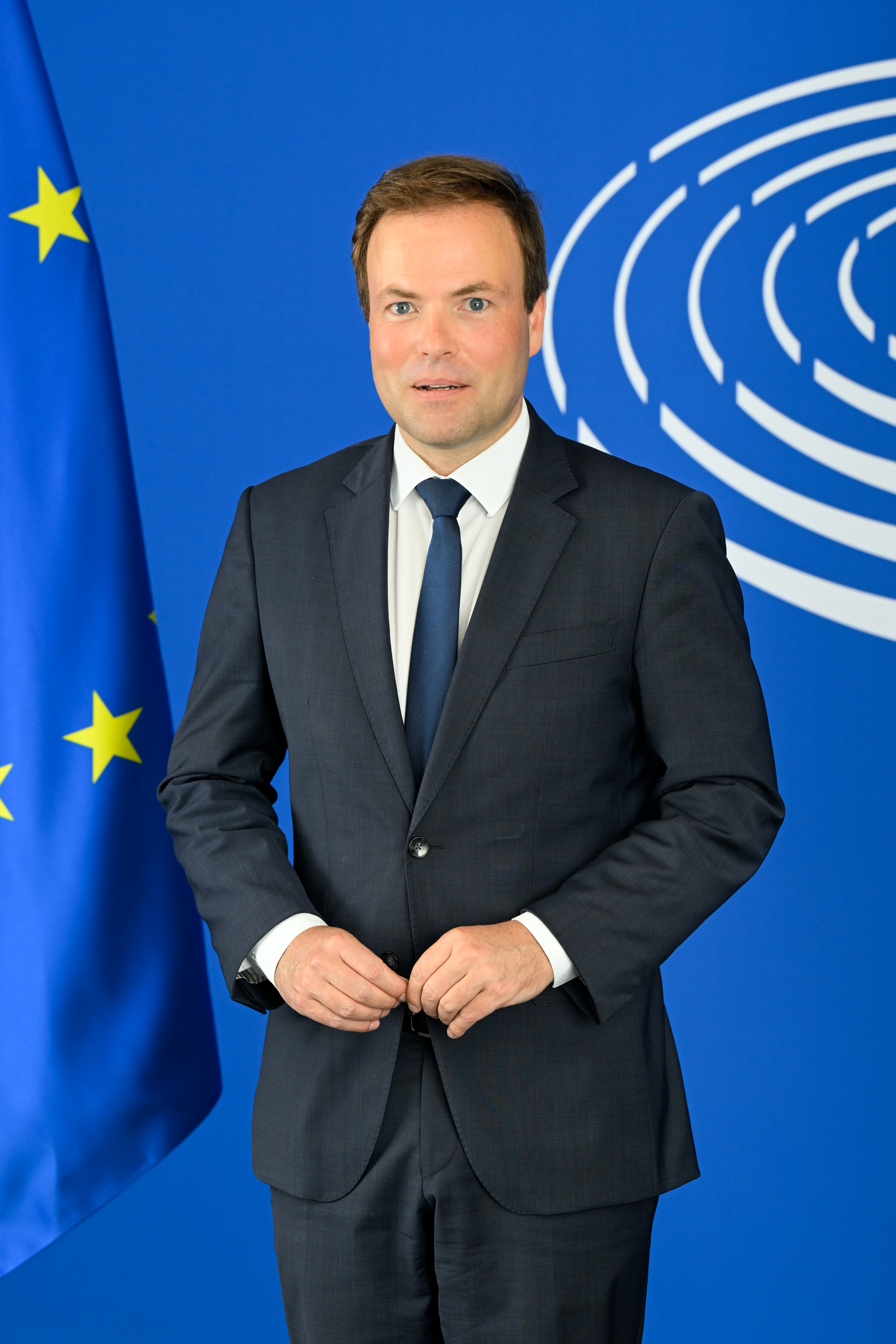

Member of the European Parliament
- Incumbent
- Assumed office 2 July 2019
- Constituency: Germany

Personal details
- Born: 9 October 1978 (age 47) Lahn, Hesse, West Germany (now Germany)
- Party: Christian Democratic Union

Sven Simon (born October 9, 1978, in Lahn, Hesse) is a German law professor and politician who has been serving as a Member of the European Parliament since 2019. He previously taught international and European law at Philipps University of Marburg. In the 2019 European Parliament election he was the lead candidate for the Christian Democratic Union Hessen.

== Academic career ==
Simon started his academic career at the Justus Liebig University Giessen and the University of Warwick at which he acquired a 'Certificate in English Law' in 2003. After his First State Examination in 2005, he pursued a law doctorate with a scholarship of the Hanns Seidel Foundation. During his doctoral studies, he was a visiting researcher at the Max Planck Institute for Comparative Public Law and International Law in Heidelberg, at the European Commission in Brussels as well as at the World Trade Organization in Geneva. In 2009 he finished his doctoral thesis on the 'Liberalization of Public Services in WTO and EU Law' at the chair of Thilo Marauhn. During his clerkships he worked at the Federal Ministry for Economic Affairs and Energy, the law firm Weber-Yacobovitch-Feder in Tel Aviv, at the law firm Freshfields Bruckhaus Deringer in Frankfurt and at the German Permanent Mission to the United Nations. In 2010 he finished the Second State Examination, thereby qualifying as an attorney in the State of Hesse.

From 2010 to 2015 Simon was a postdoctoral researcher at the chair for Public, International and European Law in Gießen. In 2011 and 2014 he was a visiting professor at the University of Wisconsin Law School in Madison. In 2015 he finished his habilitation with a monography on the 'Legal Limits of the Federal Constitutional Court in the Process of European integration'. With this he got the venia legendi to teach Public, European and International Law. From October 2015 to September 2016 he was a deputy professor at the Free University of Berlin. Since December 1, 2016 he holds the chair for International and European Law with Public Law at the University of Marburg.

Since 2011 Simon has been a member of the Federal Board in the German Association for the United Nations (DGVN). In 2017 he became the federal vice-chairman. Moreover, Simon counsels governments and NGOs on questions of international and European law and serves as a trial observer in various international court cases.

In November 2022, after plagiarism hunter Martin Heidingsfelder alleged that Simon had failed to identify sources for large parts of his dissertation the university opened an inquiry into rescinding doctorate degree. In September 2023 the university closed the investigation. It concluded in accordance with the legal opinion of three external reviewers that Simon had in fact not plagiarized in his dissertation.

== Political career ==
=== Career in local politics ===
In 2000 Simon joined the Christian Democratic Union and their youth wing Junge Union. Since then he held various positions within the party hierarchy. Currently he serves as deputy chairman of his party's chapter in the District of Giessen. and as a member in his party's regional working group on European affairs. Since 2006, he has been a member of the district parliament in Giessen, where he serves as deputy chairman of the CDU group.

=== Member of the European Parliament, 2019–present ===
In the European Parliament, Simon has been serving on the Committee on International Trade (since 2019) and the Committee on Constitutional Affairs (since 2021). Since 2021, he has been part of the Parliament's delegation to the Conference on the Future of Europe.

In addition to his committee assignments, Simon is part of the Parliament's delegation for relations with the Arab Peninsula. He is also a member of the Spinelli Group.

== Other activities ==
- Union of European Federalists, deputy state chairman
- European Academy Hesse, president (since 2017) (bpb)

== Recognition ==
- 2018 – Medal for Public Service of the District of Giessen
- 2015 – Dr. Herbert Stolzenberg Award for his habilitation thesis
- 2011 – Hessian State Award for Excellence in Academic Teaching
- 2011 – Wolfgang Mittermeier Award for Excellence in Academic Teaching
- 2009 – Award of the Justus Liebig University Giessen for the best doctoral thesis of the year 2008/09
- 2009 – Doctoral Thesis Award of the Juristische Studiengesellschaft

== Publications (selection) ==
- Liberalisierung von Dienstleistungen der Daseinsvorsorge im WTO- und EU-Recht, Mohr Siebeck, Tübingen 2009, ISBN 978-3-16-150000-8 (Dissertation)
- Grenzen des Bundesverfassungsgerichts im europäischen Integrationsprozess, Mohr Siebeck, Tübingen 2016, ISBN 978-3-16-154159-9 (Habilitation)
