= Rules of Procedure of the European Parliament =

Rules that the European parliament set

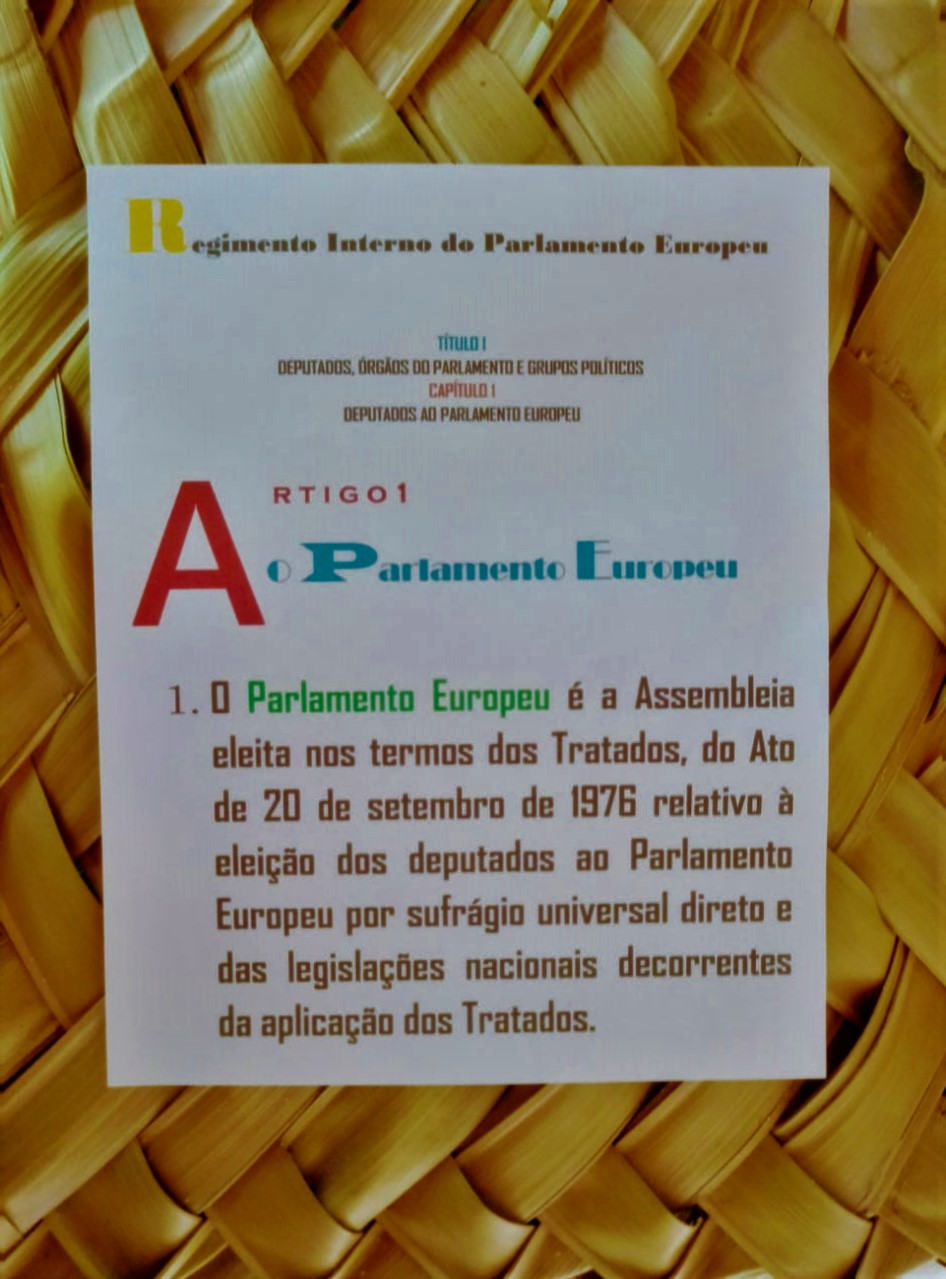
- Article number one of the Portuguese language regiment
- Created: 20 September 1976
- Author: European Parliament
- Signatories: Members of the European Parliament
- Purpose: Govern the functioning of the European Parliament in accordance with the constituent treaties of the bloc

The Rules of Procedure of the European Parliament are the internal operating rules of the European Parliament, the elected parliament of the European Union.

Article 232 of the Treaty on the Functioning of the EU specifies that "The European Parliament shall adopt its Rules of Procedure, acting by a majority of its Members".

The Parliament is therefore free to organise itself internally, provided it remains within the framework of the treaties. It regularly revises its Rules of Procedure. They are published on the Parliament's website
