= Area of freedom, security and justice =

EU's home affairs and justice policies

The area of freedom, security and justice (AFSJ) of the European Union (EU) is a policy domain concerning home affairs and migration, justice as well as fundamental rights, developed to address the challenges posed to internal security by collateral effects of the free movement of people and goods in the absence of border controls or customs inspection throughout the Schengen Area, as well as to safeguard adherence to the common European values through ensuring that the fundamental rights of people are respected across the EU.

== Scope ==
Over the years, the EU has developed a wide competence in the area of home affairs and migration, fundamental rights and justice. As internal borders have been removed within the EU, cross-border police cooperation has increased to counter cross-border crime. Some notable projects related to the area are the European Arrest Warrant, the Schengen Area and Frontex patrols. Fields covered include the harmonisation of private international law, extradition arrangements between member states, policies on internal and external border controls, common travel visa, immigration and asylum policies and police and judicial cooperation.

=== Home affairs and migration ===
For example, the EU operates facilities such as the Schengen Information System, the Visa Information System, the Common European Asylum System, the European Travel Information and Authorisation System, the Entry/Exit System, the Eurodac, the EUCARIS, the European Criminal Records Information System, the European Cybercrime Centre, FADO, PRADO and others.

=== Justice ===
Furthermore, the EU has legislated in areas such as extradition (e.g. the European Arrest Warrant), family law, asylum law, and criminal justice (e.g. the European Investigation Order).

The European Commission has listed seven offences that become European crimes. The seven crimes announced by the commission are counterfeiting euro notes and coins; credit card and cheque fraud; money laundering; people-trafficking; computer hacking and virus attacks; corruption in the private sector; and marine pollution. The possible future EU crimes are racial discrimination and incitement to racial hatred; organ trade; and corruption in awarding public contracts. It will also set out the level of penalty, such as length of prison sentence, that would apply to each crime.

=== Fundamental rights ===
Prohibitions against sexual and nationality discrimination have a long standing in the treaties. In more recent years, these have been supplemented by powers to legislate against discrimination based on race, religion, disability, age, and sexual orientation. By virtue of these powers, the EU has enacted legislation on sexual discrimination in the work-place, age discrimination, and racial discrimination.

=== Opt-outs ===
States which fully participate State with an opt-out that can opt-in on a case-by-case basis State with an opt-out

Denmark and Ireland have opted out from the area of freedom, security and justice. While Ireland has opt-ins that allows it to participate in legislation on a case-by-case basis, Denmark is fully outside the area of freedom, security and justice. Denmark has nonetheless been fully implementing the Schengen acquis since 25 March 2001, but on an intergovernmental basis. Ireland has in turn opted out from the Schengen Area in order to preserve the Common Travel Area. Nevertheless, it applied to participate in the police and judicial cooperation provisions of the Schengen acquis in June 2000 and obtained approval by a Council Decision in 2002, though it has not been implemented.

Despite AFSJ opt-out, Denmark participates through various arrangements in all AFSJ decentralised agencies except CEPOL; in parallel, Ireland has arrangements to participate in all AFSJ decentralised agencies except Frontex. Under the AFSJ opt-out, Denmark and Ireland are barred from joining the European Public Prosecutor's Office, while Hungary has decided not to participate.

In the negotiations leading up to the signing to the Lisbon Treaty, Poland (and the United Kingdom at the time) secured a protocol to the treaty limiting the application of the Charter of Fundamental Rights of the European Union in the country.

The United Kingdom had an opt-out like Ireland prior to its withdrawal from the EU. It applied to participate in several areas of the Schengen acquis, including the police and judicial cooperation provisions, in March 1999. Their request was approved by a Council Decision in 2000 and fully implemented by a Decision of the Council of the EU with effect from 1 January 2005.

== Organisation ==
=== Legislature ===
The EU legislative organs dealing specifically with the AFSJ affairs are:

- European Parliament
  - Committees of the European Parliament
    - European Parliament Committee on Civil Liberties, Justice and Home Affairs
    - European Parliament Committee on Legal Affairs
    - European Parliament Committee on Women's Rights and Gender Equality
  - Secretariat of the European Parliament
    - Directorate-General for Internal Policies of the Union
    - Directorate-General for Security
- Council of the European Union
  - Justice and Home Affairs configuration of the Council
  - General Secretariat of the Council of the European Union
    - Directorate-General for Justice and Home Affairs (JAI)
    - Directorate-General for Organisational Development and Services (ORG)

Secretariats of both institutions feature also a related structure, the Legal Service.

=== European Commission ===
The area comes under the purview of the European Commissioner for Democracy, Justice, the Rule of Law and Consumer Protection, the European Commissioner for Equality and the European Commissioner for Internal Affairs and Migration. They deal with the following matters: EU citizenship; combating discrimination, drugs, organised crime, terrorism, human trafficking; free movement of people, asylum and immigration; judicial cooperation in civil and criminal matters; police and customs cooperation; and these matters in the acceding countries. The relevant European Commission departments are the DG Justice & Consumers and the DG Migration & Home Affairs.

EC DG	Portfolio	Name	Member state
DG JUST	European Commissioner for Democracy, Justice, the Rule of Law and Consumer Protection	Michael McGrath	Ireland
DG JUST	European Commissioner for Equality	Hadja Lahbib	Belgium
DG HOME	European Commissioner for Home Affairs	Magnus Brunner	Austria

In addition, other EC members supervise services and directorates-general of the European Civil Service, technically not parts of AFSJ, but related to it thematically:

- President of the European Commission
  - Secretariat-General of the European Commission
    - Citizens, Health, Migration & Security Union
      - Citizens, Equality, Democracy & Rule of Law Unit
      - Migration, Borders & Security Unit
      - Implementation & Enforcement of EU Law Unit
  - Directorate-General for Legal Service
- European Commissioner for Budget and Administration
  - Directorate-General for Human Resources and Security
- European Commissioner for Economy
  - European Anti-Fraud Office

=== Agencies, decentralised and corporate bodies ===
As many as ten decentralised EU agencies have been incorporated under the AFSJ policy domain:

- European Union Agency for Law Enforcement Training
- Europol
- Eurojust
- eu-LISA
- Frontex
- European Union Drugs Agency
- European Union Agency for Cybersecurity
- European Union Agency for Asylum
- European Institute for Gender Equality
- Fundamental Rights Agency

Three of the executive agencies established by the European Commission are also active in the domain:

- European Research Council Executive Agency (the Social sciences and humanities domain)
- European Education and Culture Executive Agency (the Citizens, Equality, Rights and Values or CERV programme)
- European Cybersecurity Competence Centre

There is also a related decentralised independent body:

- European Public Prosecutor's Office

Further two related corporate body also exists:

- Authority for European Political Parties and European Political Foundations
- European Data Protection Board

=== Other institutions and bodies ===
Other EU institutions and bodies directly involved in the domain include:

- Court of Justice of the European Union
- European Ombudsman
- European Data Protection Supervisor
- Publications Office of the European Union

=== Funding ===
The domain has been financed by four EU funds:

- Migration & home affairs funds:
  - Asylum, Migration and Integration Fund
  - Internal Security Fund
  - Integrated Border Management Fund
- Justice & fundamental rights funds:
  - Justice, Rights and Values Fund

== Criticism ==
There has been criticism that the EU's activities have been too focused on security and not on justice. For example, the EU created the European Arrest Warrant but no common rights for defendants arrested under it.

== History ==
=== Origins (TREVI – Schengen – Dublin – Maastricht) ===
The first steps in security and justice cooperation within the EU began in 1975 when the TREVI group was created, composed of member states' justice and home affairs ministers.

TREVI was an intergovernmental network, or forum, of national officials from ministries of justice and the interior outside the European Community framework, proposed during the European Council meeting in Rome, 1–2 December 1975. It was formalized in Luxembourg on 29 June 1976 at a meeting of the European Council's Interior Ministers. It ceased to exist when it was integrated into the so-called Justice and Home Affairs (JHA) pillar of the European Union (EU) upon the entry into force of the Treaty of Maastricht in 1993.

Council agreement on establishment of TREVI

"The European Council adopted a proposal by the Prime Minister of the United Kingdom that Community Ministers for the Interior (or Ministers with similar responsibilities) should meet to discuss matters coming within their competence in particular with regard to law and order."

— The European Council in Rome, p.9 (Conclusions of the meeting, 2 Dec 1975)

The first TREVI meeting at the level of senior officials was held in Rome where the famous Trevi Fountain is located and the meeting was chaired by a Dutchman by the name of Jacques Fonteijn (English: Fountain). In some French textbooks, it is noted that TREVI stands for Terrorisme, Radicalisme, Extrémisme et Violence Internationale.

The creation of TREVI was prompted by several terrorist acts, most notably the hostage taking and subsequent massacre during the 1972 Olympic Games in Munich, and the inability of Interpol at that time to effectively assist the European countries in combatting terrorism. While TREVI was initially intended to coordinate effective counterterrorism responses among European governments, it slowly extended its remit to many other issues in crossborder policing between the members of the European Community. Many of the practices and a large part of the structure of the former Third Pillar traced their origins to TREVI.

The first real cooperation was the signing of the Schengen Implementing Convention in 1990 which opened up the EU's internal borders and established the Schengen Area. In parallel the Dublin Regulation furthered police cooperation.

=== Justice and Home Affairs (Maastricht – Amsterdam) ===
The Justice and Home Affairs (JHA) pillar was created, on the foundations of the TREVI cooperation, by the Maastricht Treaty in order to advance cooperation in criminal and justice fields without member states sacrificing a great deal of sovereignty. Before the Maastricht Treaty, member states cooperated at the intergovernmental level in various sectors relating to free movement and personal security ("group of co-ordinators", CELAD, TREVI) as well as in customs co-operation (GAM) and judicial policy. The Maastricht Treaty established that, while reaching the objectives of the Union, and notably the freedom of movement, the member states consider the following as areas of common interest under Justice and Home Affairs:

1. Asylum;
2. Rules concerning the entrance of external borders;
3. Immigration policies and policies concerning third countries' citizens:
  - Conditions of entry and circulation for foreign citizens in the territory of the Union;
  - Conditions of residence for foreign citizens in the territory of Member States, comprising families and employment access;
  - Fight against irregular immigration, residence and work of foreigners within the territory of the Union;
4. Combating illicit drugs where this is not covered by point 7), 8) and 9);
5. Fight against international fraud where this is not covered by points 7), 8) and 9);
6. Judicial co-operation in civil matters;
7. Judicial co-operation in penal matters;
8. Customs co-operation;
9. Police co-operation for preventing and fighting terrorism, drugs trade and other grave forms of international criminality, comprising, if necessary, certain aspects of customs co-operation.

With Maastricht, Justice and Home Affairs co-operation aimed at reinforcing actions taken by member states while allowing a more coherent approach of these actions, by offering new tools for coordinating actions. Decisions were taken by a unanimous vote of the Council without participation of the European Parliament (as opposed to decisionmaking in the European Community areas).

The Justice and Home Affairs pillar was organised on an intergovernmental basis with little involvement of the EU supranational institutions such as the European Commission and the European Parliament. Under this pillar the EU created the European Monitoring Centre for Drugs and Drug Addiction (EMCDDA) in 1993 and Europol in 1995. In 1997 the EU adopted an action plan against organised crime and established the European Monitoring Centre on Racism and Xenophobia (EUMC). In 1998 the European Judicial Network in criminal matters (EJN) was established.

=== Police and Judicial Co-operation in Criminal Matters and the concept of an area of freedom, security and justice (Amsterdam – Nice – Prüm – Lisbon) ===
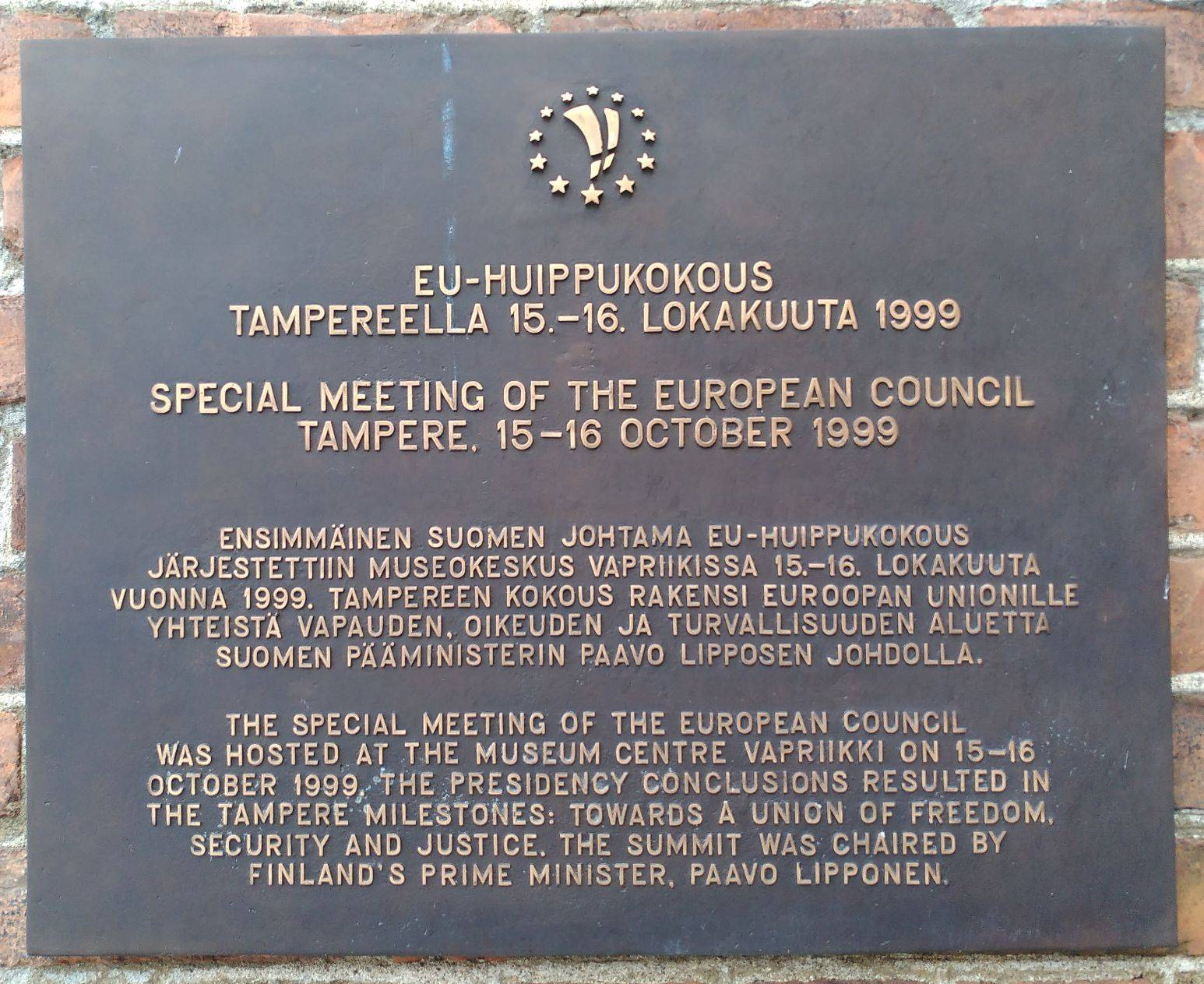
Plaque commemorating the 1999 European Council meeting in Tampere

The Treaty of Amsterdam transferred the areas of illegal immigration, visas, asylum and judicial cooperation in civil matters from the JHA to the European Community pillar, while the extant part of the intergovernmental 3rd pillar was renamed Police and Judicial Co-operation in Criminal Matters (PJCC) to reflect its reduced scope. During this time further advancements were made.The European Police College (CEPOL) was also created.

The treaty was also the first legal act to introduce the concept of area of freedom, security and justice, stating that the EU must "maintain and develop the Union as an area of freedom, security and justice, in which the free movement of persons is assured in conjunction with appropriate measures with respect to external border controls, asylum, immigration and the prevention and combating of crime." The first work programme putting this provision into effect was agreed at Tampere, Finland in October 1999. Subsequently, the Hague programme, agreed in November 2004, set further objectives to be achieved between 2005 and 2010.

The Treaty of Nice enshrined Eurojust in the EU treaties and in 2001 and 2002 Eurojust, Eurodac, the European Judicial Network in Civil and Commercial Matters (EJNCC) and European Crime Prevention Network (EUCPN) were established. In 2004 the EU appointed an anti-terrorism coordinator in response to the 2004 Madrid train bombings and the European Arrest Warrant (agreed in 2002) entered into force.

In 2005, the Prüm Convention was adopted by Austria, Belgium, France, Germany, Luxembourg, the Netherlands and Spain in the town of Prüm in Germany, and which has been open to all members of the European Union, 14 of which are currently parties. Its goal has been to enable the signatories to exchange data regarding DNA, fingerprints and vehicle registration of concerned persons and to cooperate against terrorism. It also contains provisions for the deployment of armed sky marshals on flights between signatory states, joint police patrols, entry of (armed) police forces into the territory of another state for the prevention of immediate danger (hot pursuit), and cooperation in case of mass events or disasters. Furthermore, a police officer responsible for an operation in a state may, in principle, decide to what degree the police forces of the other states that were taking part in the operation could use their weapons or exercise other powers.

In 2006, a toxic waste spill off the coast of Côte d'Ivoire, from a European ship, prompted the commission to look into legislation against toxic waste. Environment Commissioner Stavros Dimas stated that "Such highly toxic waste should never have left the European Union". With countries such as Spain not even having a law against shipping toxic waste Franco Frattini, the Justice, Freedom and Security Commissioner, proposed with Dimas to create criminal sentences for "ecological crimes". His right to do this was contested in 2005 at the Court of Justice resulting in a victory for the commission. That ruling set a precedent that the commission, on a supranational basis, may legislate in criminal law. So far though, the only other use has been the intellectual property rights directive. Motions were tabled in the European Parliament against that legislation on the basis that criminal law should not be an EU competence, but were rejected at vote. However, in October 2007 the Court of Justice ruled the commission could not propose what the criminal sanctions could be, only that there must be some.

Some of the Prüm Convention provisions, falling under the former third pillar of the EU, were later subsumed into the police and judicial cooperation provisions of European Union law by a 2008 Council Decision, commonly referred to as the Prüm Decision. It provides for Law Enforcement Cooperation in criminal matters primarily related to exchange of fingerprint, DNA (both on a hit no-hit basis) and Vehicle owner registration (direct access via the EUCARIS system) data. The data exchange provisions were implemented in 2012. The remaining provisions of the Convention falling under the former third pillar were adopted into EU law over the following five years.

=== The area of freedom, security and justice (Lisbon – onwards) ===
The 2009 Treaty of Lisbon abolished the pillar structure, reuniting the areas separated at Amsterdam. Both the extant intergovernmental areas (the PJCC) and those transferred from JHA to the Community were once again reunited to form a single area of freedom, security and justice of the reformed European Union, thus turning the concept into a policy domain entirely under both the community method decisionmaking and the judicial purview of the Court of Justice, with the relevant legislation being thereafter made in any case through co-decision of the Council voting with qualified majority and the European Parliament. The Charter of Fundamental Rights also gained legal force and Europol was brought within the EU's legal framework. As the Treaty of Lisbon came into force, the European Council adopted the Stockholm Programme to provide EU action on developing the area over the following five years. With the strengthened powers under Lisbon, the second Barroso Commission created a dedicated commissioner for justice (previously combined with security under one portfolio) who is obliging member states to provide reports on their implementation of the Charter of Fundamental Rights. Furthermore, the commission is putting forward proposals for common rights for defendants (such as interpretation), minimum standards for prison conditions and ensure that victims of crime are taken care of properly wherever they are in the EU. This is intended to create a common judicial area where each system can be sure of trusting each other.

The border agency Frontex, which is responsible for overseeing the security of the EU's external borders, has been upgraded. This reformed body, now called the European Border and Coastguard Agency, involves having a pool of armed guards, drawn from different EU member states, that can be dispatched to EU countries at three days' notice. The European Border and Coastguard Agency functions more in a supervisory capacity. The border agencies of host countries still retain day-to-day control, and the personnel from the new agency are required to submit to the direction of the country where they are deployed. However, interventions happen sometimes against the wishes of a host country. They include instances such as "disproportionate migratory pressure" occurring on a country's border. For this intervention to happen, the new border agency has to gain consent from the European Commission. The border guards are allowed to carry guns. The agency is also able to acquire its own supply of patrol ships and helicopters.

== Future perspectives ==
The European Union's growing role in coordinating internal security and safety policies is only partly captured by looking at policymaking within the area of freedom, security and justice. Across the EU's other (former) pillars, initiatives related to food security, health safety, infrastructure protection, counter-terrorism and energy security can be found. New perspectives and concepts have been introduced to examine the EU's wider internal security role for the EU, such as the EU's "protection policy space" or internal "security governance". Furthermore, EU cooperation not covered by a limited lens of the Area of Freedom, Security and Justice—namely EU cooperation during urgent emergencies and complex crises—has received a growing amount of attention.

== See also ==
- Citizenship of the European Union
- Directorate-General for Justice, Freedom and Security (European Commission)
- Eurojust
- European Commissioner for Home Affairs
- European Commissioner for Justice, Fundamental Rights and Citizenship
- European Public Prosecutor
- European Survey on Crime and Safety (EU ICS)
- European Union law
- Europol
- eu-LISA
- Former European Commissioner for Justice, Freedom and Security
- Four Freedoms (European Union)
- Schengen Agreement
- United Nations Interregional Crime and Justice Research Institute
- Mechanism for Cooperation and Verification
- European Investigation Order
- G6 (Group of Six)
- Salzburg Forum
