= Directorate-General for Justice and Consumers =

DG Justice, Freedom and Security was split in 2010. For Home Affairs (security), see Directorate-General for Home Affairs (European Commission).

The Directorate-General for Justice and Consumers (DG JUST) is a Directorate-General of the European Commission. The role of the body is to ensure that the whole European Union (EU) is an area of freedom, security and justice. The specific tasks and responsibilities of the DG are laid down by the Treaty of Rome (see Part Two, Articles 17–22; Part Three, Title III, Articles 39–47), the Treaty of Amsterdam, which came into force on 1 May 1999, and the conclusions of the European Council meeting in Tampere (Finland), a special meeting held on 15–16 October 1999 concerned with the creation of an area of freedom, security and justice within the EU.

The relevant Commissioner is the European Commissioner for Justice, Consumers and Gender Equality (formerly European Commissioner for Justice, Fundamental Rights and Citizenship), currently Commissioners Didier Reynders and Helena Dalli. The current Director-General is Ana Gallego Torres.

In 2023 it had 400 employees.

== Structure ==
As of 2024, the DG Justice and Consumers is divided into 5 directorates, namely :

- Directorate A : Justice
- Directorate B : Consumers
- Directorate C : Rule of law and fundamental rights
- Directorate D : Equality and non-discrimination
- Directorate E : Horizontal issues

DG Justice and Consumers is responsible for relations with the following EU agencies: the EU Agency for Fundamental Rights (FRA), the European Institute for Gender Equality (EIGE) and the European Union Judicial Cooperation Unit (EUROJUST).

== History ==
DG JUSTICE was created in 2010 when the DG Justice, Freedom and Security was split into DG JUSTICE and the Directorate-General for Home Affairs.

== See also ==
- European Commissioner for Justice
- Directorate-General for Home Affairs
- European Commissioner for Home Affairs
- Justice and Home Affairs Council (Council of the European Union)
  - Directorate-General for Justice and Home Affairs
- European Parliament Committee on Civil Liberties, Justice and Home Affairs
- Area of freedom, security and justice
- Charter of Fundamental Rights of the European Union
- Four Freedoms
- European Court of Justice
- Court of First Instance
- European Union Civil Service Tribunal
- European Convention on Human Rights
- European Court of Human Rights
- Universal Declaration of Human Rights
- International Covenant on Civil and Political Rights
- International Covenant on Economic, Social and Cultural Rights
- Police and Judicial Co-operation in Criminal Matters
- Eurojust
- European Union Agency for Fundamental Rights (FRA)
- European Institute for Gender Equality (EIGE)
- Acquis communautaire
