= Kompania Bello =

Albanian cocaine-trafficking network

Kompania Bello (Albanian-speaking: “Bello Company”) is the name used by European law-enforcement bodies for a transnational, Albanian-speaking cocaine-trafficking network alleged to have organised shipments from South America to Europe and coordinated wholesale distribution across several EU member states. In September 2020, a five-year, multi-country investigation culminated in coordinated raids and pre-trial detentions marketed under the codename Operation Los Blancos. According to Eurojust, the investigation led to 20 arrests on the action day, 84 additional arrests over the course of the probe, and seizures totalling close to 4 tonnes of cocaine and over €5.5 million in cash.

== Europol assessment ==
Europol and Eurojust describe Kompania Bello as one of Europe’s most active Albanian-speaking cocaine networks prior to its takedown. Investigators say the group negotiated directly with South American cartels, arranged shipments to major European ports, and oversaw downstream distribution via accomplices in Italy, the Netherlands, Albania and other countries—short-circuiting the traditional separation between importers and wholesalers.

== History and structure ==
Analysts and reporters covering the case have characterised the network as a federation of criminal operators rather than a single rigid hierarchy, linked by brokerage, logistics, and financial services.

Open-source case materials indicate that by the mid-2010s the network had established direct procurement channels in Latin America and extraction/distribution cells around several European ports. Investigators reported the use of encrypted communications to coordinate maritime consignments and overland movements, and the use of concealment methods such as modified vehicles for onward transport inside Europe.

Eurojust reported the network used an underground informal value transfer method of Chinese origin known as fei ch'ien to move and settle proceeds internationally, reducing reliance on traceable banking channels. The Organized Crime and Corruption Reporting Project likewise reported the use of informal remittance networks to launder millions of euros.

Eurojust’s public case note does not name the ringleader, but states that the organisation’s leader negotiated directly with South American suppliers, operating from outside the EU. Independent reporting has widely linked Dritan Rexhepi, an Albanian national with a history of arrests and escapes, to the orchestration of the network from Ecuador. Subsequent reporting detailed his shifts from prison to home detention in Ecuador and legal exposure in multiple European jurisdictions.

== 2020 raids ==
On 15–17 September 2020, law-enforcement and judicial authorities from at least seven European countries executed coordinated raids under Eurojust/Europol support. The action day resulted in 20 arrests across Europe and Dubai; the wider investigation recorded 84 arrests in Italy, Ecuador, the Netherlands, the United Kingdom, Switzerland and Germany. Seizures across the five-year probe amounted to ~4 tonnes of cocaine and €5.5 million in cash.

Europol described the case as the dismantling of “one of Europe’s most active Albanian-speaking networks trafficking cocaine into Europe,” noting the group’s end-to-end control over the supply chain “from arranging huge shipments directly from South America to the distribution throughout Europe.”

Post-2020, European agencies continued related inquiries into Balkan-origin cocaine logistics and finance, while policy analyses highlighted the growing role of Western Balkans brokers in Latin America and their competition with established European syndicates. Reporting also examined the Ecuadorian context—including prison governance failures and episodes of home detention or release involving high-value European brokers—illustrating the challenges of sustained incapacitation in producer/transit countries.
