= Aingeal O'Donoghue =

Ambassador

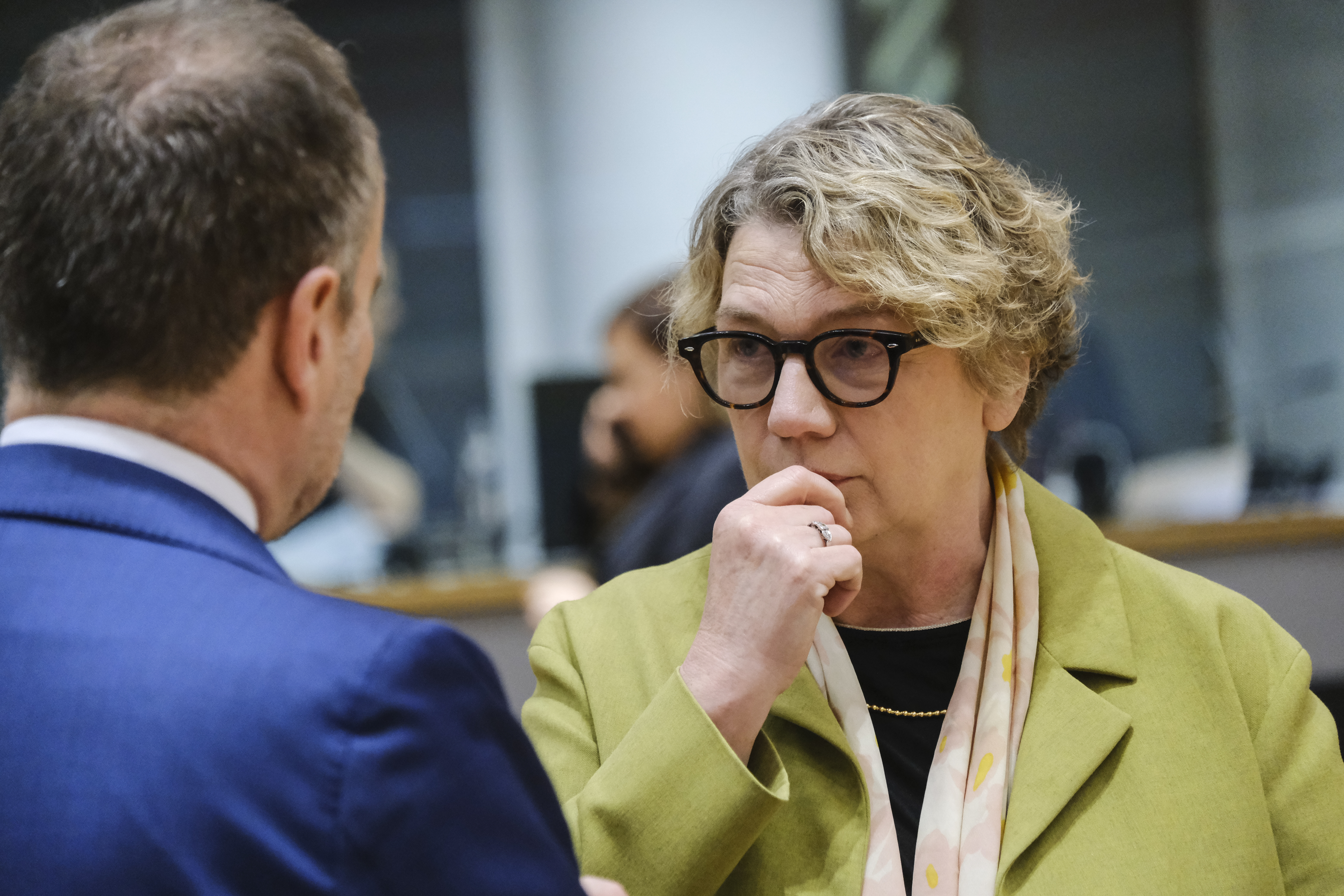
Aingeal O'Donoghue at the Justice and Home Affairs Council in December 2023.

Aingeal O'Donoghue (born 1962) was the first woman ambassador of Ireland to the Republic of Korea, taking up the post in August 2013. She has been the Director General of the European Union Division in the Department of Foreign Affairs and serves on its management board. O'Donoghue is a graduate of University College Cork. Since August 2023, she is Ireland's Permanent Representative to the EU.
