= Directorate-General for Migration and Home Affairs =

Directorate-General of the European Commission

The Directorate-General for Migration and Home Affairs (DG HOME) is a Directorate-General of the European Commission responsible for Internal security, Migration and Border management. Its role is to ensure the security of the Schengen area, build a common EU migration and asylum policy, and to promote dialogue and cooperation with non-EU countries. DG HOME works closely with EU Member States and EU Agencies, international organisations and other stakeholders to develop and implement policies at the EU level. Thereby, it contributes to the area of freedom, security and justice (AFSJ).

As of January 2024, Beate Gminder is the acting Director-General of the Directorate-General Migration and Home Affairs. There are two Deputy Directors-General: Johannes Luchner responsible for "horizontal affairs and migration", and Olivier Onidi in charge of "Schengen & security" acting also as the EU Counter-Terrorism Co-ordinator.

As of 1 December 2024, the Commissioner responsible for Home Affairs under the von der Leyen Commission II is Magnus Brunner, the European Commissioner for Home Affairs.

== Structure ==
=== Directorate A: Directorate for International and Horizontal Affairs ===
This Directorate is made up of four policy coordination units (1) Policy Coordination and Inter-institutional Relations, (2) Communication, (3) International Affairs, and (4) Legal Affairs.

=== Directorate B: Schengen, Borders & Visa ===
This Directorate is made up of four policy units (1) Schengen and External Borders, (2) Schengen Governance, (3) Digital Schengen, and (4) Visa policy.

=== Directorate C: Migration & Asylum ===
This Directorate is made up of five policy units (1) Return and Readmission (2) Legal Pathways and Integration, (3) Asylum, (4) Migration Management Response & Counter-Smuggling, and (5) Migration Management Preparedness.

=== Directorate D: Internal security ===
This Directorate is made up of five policy units (1) Law Enforcement Cooperation, (2) Counter-Terrorism, (3) Prevention of Radicalisation, (4) Security in the Digital Age, and (5) Organised Crime and Drugs.

=== Directorate E: HOME Affairs Funds ===
This Directorate is made up of five financial policy units (1) Funds Coordination, (2) South and Central Europe (I), (3) North, West and Central Europe (II), (4) Union actions and Procurement, and (5) Budget and Reporting.

=== Directorate F: Innovation and audit ===
This Directorate is made up of two units (1) Audit and Compliance and (2) Innovation & Security Research.

=== Agencies of the European Union ===
Additionally, there are the following Migration and Home Affairs Agencies:

- Frontex - European Border and Coast Guard Agency
- EUAA - European Union Agency for Asylum
- Europol - European Union Agency for Law Enforcement Cooperation
- eu-LISA - European Agency for the operational management of large-scale IT systems in the area of freedom, security and justice
- CEPOL - European Union Agency for Law Enforcement Training
- EUDA - European Union Drugs Agency

== Policy actions ==
To achieve its goals in internal affairs and migration, the European Commission coordinates several major political initiatives. The most important are:

- Pact on Migration and Asylum - a common EU system to manage migration adopted in 2024. Most of the rules will start to apply in June 2026. Overview of news about the Pact are available on Euractiv.
- Strengthening Schengen and securing external borders
- New internal security strategy (to be proposed in 2025)

== History ==
DG HOME was created in 2010 when the DG Justice, Freedom and Security was split into DG HOME and the Directorate-General for Justice.

== See also ==
- European Civil Service (i.a. for all DGs)
- European Commissioner for Home Affairs
- European Commissioner for Justice, Fundamental Rights and Citizenship
- Directorate-General for Justice and Consumers
- Justice and Home Affairs Council (Council of the European Union)
- Area of Freedom, Security and Justice
- Charter of Fundamental Rights of the European Union
- Four Freedoms
- European Convention on Human Rights
- Universal Declaration of Human Rights
- Police and Judicial Co-operation in Criminal Matters
