= Prüm Convention =

Law enforcement treaty in part of Europe

Convention on the stepping up of cross-border cooperation, particularly in combating terrorism, cross-border crime and illegal migration
- Parties to the Prüm Convention and Prüm Decision participants Other Prüm Decision participants non-EU member states participating non-EU member states which have signed an agreement to participate
- Type: Intergovernmental agreement
- Signed: 27 May 2005
- Location: Prüm, Germany
- Effective: 1 November 2006
- Condition: 2 ratifications
- Parties: 14
- Depositary: Ministry of Foreign Affairs of the Federal Republic of Germany
- Languages: German, Spanish, French and Dutch (original)

Full text
- Prüm Convention at Wikisource

The Prüm Convention (inaccurately known as Schengen III Agreement) is a law enforcement treaty which was signed on 27 May 2005 by Austria, Belgium, France, Germany, Luxembourg, the Netherlands and Spain in the town of Prüm in Germany, and which is open to all members of the European Union, 14 of which are currently parties. Initiated by the German minister Otto Schily in mid-2003, its core elements were integrated into EU law by EU Council Decision 2008/615/JHA on 23 June 2008 on the stepping up of cross-border cooperation, particularly in combating terrorism and cross-border crime. The full name of the treaty is Convention between the Kingdom of Belgium, the Federal Republic of Germany, the Kingdom of Spain, the French Republic, the Grand Duchy of Luxembourg, the Kingdom of the Netherlands and the Republic of Austria on the stepping up of cross-border cooperation, particularly in combating terrorism, cross-border crime and illegal migration.

== Provisions ==
The Convention was adopted so as to enable the signatories to exchange data regarding DNA, fingerprints and vehicle registration of concerned persons and to cooperate against terrorism. It also contains provisions for the deployment of armed sky marshals on flights between signatory states, joint police patrols, entry of (armed) police forces into the territory of another state for the prevention of immediate danger (hot pursuit), and cooperation in case of mass events or disasters. Furthermore, a police officer responsible for an operation in a state may, in principle, decide to what degree the police forces of the other states that were taking part in the operation could use their weapons or exercise other powers.

== Relation to the European Union ==
The Convention was adopted outside of the European Union framework (and its mechanism of enhanced co-operation), but asserts that it is open for accession by any member state of the European Union and that:

provisions of this Convention shall only apply in so far as they are compatible with European Union law ... [EU law] should take precedence in applying the relevant provisions of this Convention

— Convention on the stepping up of cross-border cooperation, particularly in combating terrorism, cross-border crime and illegal migration, Article 47

Additionally the text of the Convention and its annexes were circulated on 7 July 2005 between the delegations to the Council of the European Union.

=== Prüm Decision ===
Some of the Convention provisions, falling under the former third pillar of the EU, were later subsumed into the police and judicial cooperation provisions of European Union law by a 2008 Council Decision, commonly referred to as the Prüm Decision. It provides for Law Enforcement Cooperation in criminal matters primarily related to exchange of fingerprint, DNA (both on a hit no-hit basis) and Vehicle owner registration (direct access via the EUCARIS system) data. The data exchange provisions are to be implemented in 2012. The remaining provisions of the Convention falling under the former third pillar are not yet adopted into EU law.

While the Decisions were originally applicable to all EU member states, the United Kingdom subsequently exercised their right to opt out from them effective 1 December 2014. However, the UK committed to assess their future participation and make a decision by 31 December 2015 on whether to rejoin the Decisions. On 22 January 2016 the UK notified the EU of its desire to resume participating in the Prum Decisions, which was approved by the Commission on 20 May 2016.

=== Prüm II ===
Announced in Spring 2021, Prüm II aims to expand the amount of information that can be shared, including photos and information from driving licenses which raised concerns in regard to facial recognition in particular in regard to using existing photos such as police mugshots against newly captured images such as those from CCTV camera. Prüm II was eventually signed by both the European Parliament and the Council on 14 March 2024 and was subsequently published in the EU Journal on 5 April 2024. Ireland, which has an opt out from participating in the AFSJ policy area, decided to opt in and participate, while Denmark's full opt-out prevented it from participating.

== Parties to the convention ==
The states which have ratified the convention are:

Contracting party	Date of signature	Date of deposit of instrument of ratification or accession	Entry into force
Austria	27 May 2005	21 June 2006	1 November 2006
Belgium	27 May 2005	5 February 2007	6 May 2007
Bulgaria	-	25 May 2009	23 August 2009
Estonia	-	23 September 2008	22 December 2008
Finland	-	19 March 2007	17 June 2007
France	27 May 2005	2 October 2007	31 December 2007
Germany	27 May 2005	25 August 2006	23 November 2006
Hungary	-	16 October 2007	14 January 2008
Luxembourg	27 May 2005	8 February 2007	9 May 2007
Netherlands	27 May 2005	20 February 2008	20 May 2008
Romania	-	3 December 2008	3 March 2009
Slovakia	-	27 February 2009	28 May 2009
Slovenia	-	10 May 2007	8 August 2007
Spain	27 May 2005	3 August 2006	1 November 2006

The Dutch Senate ratified the treaty without a vote.

In June 2007, Greece, Italy, Portugal and Sweden, notified the Council of the European Union of their desire to accede to the Prüm Convention.

Norway and Iceland signed a treaty with the EU in 2009 to apply certain provisions of the Decisions. Norway ratified the agreement and it entered into force for it as of 1 December 2020, while Iceland has not ratified as of December 2025. Denmark, Ireland and the United Kingdom have opt-outs from participating in the Council Decision approving the agreement with Norway and Iceland. While Ireland and the United Kingdom decided to opt in, the agreement does not apply to Denmark. Switzerland and Liechtenstein signed agreements on their participation in the Prüm regime on 27 June 2019. Ireland and the UK again opted-in to participate in the agreement, but it does not apply to Denmark. Following ratification, the agreement entered into force for Switzerland as of 1 March 2023, and for Liechtenstein as of 1 June 2025.

On 23 June 2016 the United Kingdom voted to leave the EU. After withdrawal negotiations concluded, the United Kingdom left the EU on 31 January 2020.

== See also ==
- Area of freedom, security and justice
- Enhanced co-operation
- Schengen Agreement
- Schengen Area
