= Cecilia Malmström =

Swedish politician (born 1968)

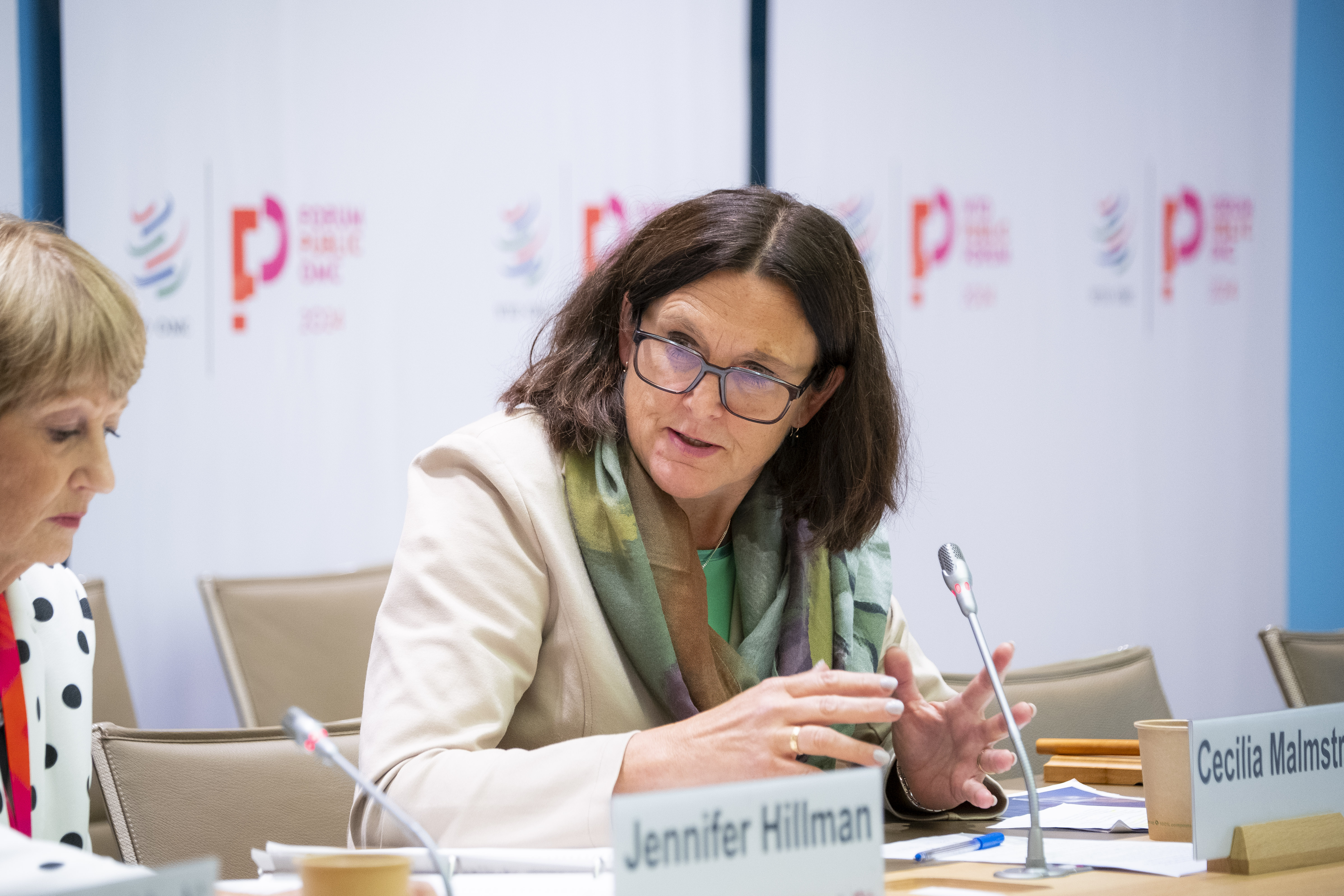
- Malmström in 2024

European Commissioner for Trade
- In office 1 November 2014 – 30 November 2019
- Commission: Juncker
- Preceded by: Karel De Gucht
- Succeeded by: Phil Hogan

European Commissioner for Home Affairs
- In office 9 February 2010 – 1 November 2014
- Commission: Barroso II
- Preceded by: Jacques Barrot
- Succeeded by: Dimitris Avramopoulos (Migration, Home Affairs and Citizenship)

Minister for European Union Affairs
- In office 6 October 2006 – 22 January 2010
- Prime Minister: Fredrik Reinfeldt
- Preceded by: New office
- Succeeded by: Birgitta Ohlsson

Member of the European Parliament for Sweden
- In office 1 July 1999 – 4 October 2006

Personal details
- Born: Anna Cecilia Malmström; 15 May 1968 (age 58) Stockholm, Sweden
- Party: Liberals (before 2023); Independent (2023–present)
- Other political affiliations: Alliance of Liberals and Democrats for Europe
- Education: University of Gothenburg; University of Paris
- Website: Official website
- Cecilia Malmström's voice (0:11) Malmström at the Gothenburg Book Fair; Recorded 24 September 2011

Anna Cecilia Malmström (born 15 May 1968) is a Swedish politician who served as European Commissioner for Trade from 2014 to 2019. She previously served as European Commissioner for Home Affairs from 2010 to 2014 and Minister for European Union Affairs from 2006 to 2010. She was a Member of the European Parliament (MEP) from Sweden from 1999 to 2006.

She was a member of the Swedish Liberals (part of the Alliance of Liberals and Democrats for Europe) until 2023.

== Early life ==
Malmström was born in Brännkyrka parish in southern Stockholm and grew up in Gothenburg.

She was a student at the University of Gothenburg from 1992 to 1999, becoming a research assistant (1994). She then gained a PhD in political science with a thesis titled The Region, the Power and the Glory: Regional Parties in Western Europe (1998), and became a senior lecturer at the Department of Political Science at the University of Gothenburg (1998–99). Her thesis was on regional parties in western Europe, focusing on Catalonia, Spain and Lombardy, Italy. She has researched and taught in the fields of European politics, regionalism, immigration and terrorism.

Malmström has also worked in Stuttgart and in Barcelona.

She is fluent in Swedish, English, Spanish and French, and has intermediate skills in German and Italian.

== Political career ==
Malmström has been a member of the Swedish Liberals party since the late 1980s, sitting on the party executive since 1997, and was a member of the Västra Götaland Regional Council from 1998 to 2001. In 2007, when Jan Björklund was elected party leader, she was appointed first vice party chairman.

=== Member of the European Parliament, 1999–2006 ===
In 1999, Malmström was elected as an MEP for Sweden and she was re-elected again in 2004. During her tenure she served on the Committees on Foreign Affairs, Committee on Constitutional Affairs, Committee on the Internal Market and Consumer Protection and also on the Subcommittee on Human Rights and Subcommittee on Security and Defence. In addition, she served as vice-chair of the parliament's delegations to Hungary (before it joined in 2004) and Croatia.

As a member of the Committee on Foreign Affairs, Malmström wrote a critical report on the EU's Russia strategy. In 2002 she became the Liberal group's spokeswoman on foreign affairs. She nominated Cuban dissident Oswaldo Payá for the Sakharov Prize, which he received from the Parliament in 2002.

During her time as an MEP, Malmström initiated the oneseat.eu web campaign, which aims to make Brussels the permanent seat of the European Parliament. It was the first such petition to gain one million signatures, a nod to the right of petition under the Treaty of Lisbon.

In 2001, Malmström and nine fellow MEPs – including Nick Clegg and Helle Thorning-Schmidt – founded the Campaign for Parliamentary Reform (CPR) to press for changes to the way the European Parliament functions on a day-to-day basis. She has also campaigned for greater public access to official documents.

=== Swedish Minister for European Affairs, 2006–2010 ===
Following the 2006 Swedish elections which saw the victory of the centre-right coalition of Fredrik Reinfeldt, Malmström returned to Sweden to take up the job of Minister for European Affairs in Prime Minister Reinfeldt's cabinet, which took office on 6 October 2006. Her responsibilities included institutional issues, review of the EU budget, Baltic Sea Strategy, the Lisbon Strategy and coordinating the Swedish Presidency of the Council of the European Union in 2009.

Malmström supports Swedish adoption of the euro currency, and in August 2007 she was one of the politicians calling for another referendum on euro membership (the first was in 2003). "We respect the result of the referendum, of course, but still think that one should be able to argue for something one believes in, a lot had changed since the 2003 referendum. [..] Slovenia has joined, Malta and Cyprus are joining at the beginning of next year. Next year, at least two Baltic countries will join. In 2010–11 there could be eight or nine new members. The more members there are, the greater the political price of being outside, because we can't make a difference, Sweden had lost out economically by not joining the single European currency." She cited a report from the National Board of Trade: "We have lost 100 billion kronor in exports and the same amount in imports. Our trade with the eurozone would have been 13–14 percent greater if we had been members."

== Member of the European Commission, 2010–2019 ==
=== European Commissioner for Home Affairs, 2010–2014 ===
On 17 November 2009 Malmström was nominated by her government as Sweden's next European Commissioner. In his nomination, Prime Minister Reinfeldt also said that Carl Bildt, the foreign minister, was not nominated because it was unlikely that a Swede would be appointed to the post of President of the European Council or as High Representative of the Union for Foreign Affairs and Security Policy.

The President of the European Commission, José Manuel Barroso offered Malmström the role of Commissioner for Home Affairs, which was created as a result of a liberal demand to split the previous portfolio, which had also included human rights. Despite this post being security oriented, Commissioner Malmström made clear to the Members of the European Parliament that she would not be a bad cop to the fundamental rights portfolio's good cop. She was approved by MEPs, and took up the post on 10 February 2010.

One of her first initiatives as a Commissioner of the European Union was to propose a directive advocating stronger sanctions against sexual abuse of children, in which one of the proposals was to create a duty for EU member states to block access to child pornography on the Internet. Critics interpret that as the creation of a net censorship infrastructure which would not help children, but would indeed be counterproductive and a dangerous threat to democracy. NGOs working for children's rights, such as Save the Children and NSPCC, have, however, defended the proposal. Malmström was quickly rewarded with the nickname 'Censilia' on the social web and in – mostly German – dailies, a portmanteau word blending the word "censorship" and her given name ("Cecilia"), in imitation of the "Zensursula" nickname of the German minister Ursula von der Leyen who failed to establish similar filtering techniques in Germany following a decision to prioritize the deletion of illegal websites.

At the same period (March 2010), in pursuit of her efforts to strengthen the safety and security of European citizens, Malmström secured a political agreement between the European Parliament, the Council and the Commission to implement Article 10 of the United Nations' Firearms Protocol that combats the trafficking of illicit civilian firearms.

On 11 March 2011, during the Seventh European Day of Remembrance of Victims of Terrorism, at a conference on "The role of Victims of Terrorism in preventing violent radicalization", which was held in Brussels, Malmström gave a speech setting out the devastating effects of terrorism on a personal as well as on a state level, closing with the announcement of the forthcoming (R.A.N.) project (see next paragraph).

In September 2011, Malmström officially launched the Radicalisation Awareness Network (R.A.N.), a project aimed at tackling terrorism and violent extremism through preventive measures, rather than through confrontation. The project comes as an additional tool of the EU's Counter-Terrorism and Measures to Combat Radicalisation and Recruitment to Terrorism Strategies.

Less than a year later, the project had become a pan-European network of scientists, psychologists, NGOs, victims of terrorism, religious leaders, representatives of civil society and police officers, together with an advisory board.

On 2 May 2012, Malmström gave a lecture to students and professors at Harvard University on immigration and asylum, discussing with her audience various issues related to integration, terrorism and human trafficking, as well as the European crisis. The visit in Cambridge was followed by a meeting with the US Attorney General Eric Holder in Washington, D.C., and an evening at the F.B.I., where there was a major exchange of views about the planning of the forthcoming European Cybercrime Centre (E.C.3). Malmström's short trip in the US was completed with a speech on Cyber Security at a Conference in the C.S.I.S.

On 26 November 2012, together with Rob Wainwright, director of Europol, Malmström announced the launch of the new European Financial Coalition against Commercial Sexual Exploitation of Children Online. The aims of the Coalition are to support international law enforcement investigations wherever possible through co-operation with private stakeholders; to assess and study commercial child sexual exploitation on the Internet through all kinds of Internet environments, such as hosting services and newsgroups; to help protect legitimate private business interests from possible misuse of their services by criminals aiming to distribute child sexual abuse content through different information and communication technologies; to enable law enforcement and private companies to counteract the problem through training and resource-sharing; and to keep decision makers informed and raise awareness among the public.

On 5 December 2012 on a conference held in Brussels, Belgium, under the High Patronage of Her Majesty Queen Paola of Belgium, Malmström and US Attorney General Eric Holder launched the Global Alliance against Child Sexual Abuse Online.

The alliance, which met strong support from Wainwright, is an initiative aimed at uniting decision-makers all around the world, to improve the identification of, and assistance to, victims, and the prosecution of the perpetrators. The alliance is one of the greatest projects ever created in this field, as its participants include 48 nations worldwide (The 27 EU member states, as well as 21 non EU countries – Albania, Australia, Cambodia, Croatia, Georgia, Ghana, Japan, Moldova, Montenegro, New Zealand, Nigeria, Norway, the Philippines, Serbia, Republic of Korea, Switzerland, Thailand, Turkey, Ukraine, United States of America, and Vietnam).

On 11 January 2013, Wainwright and Malmström officially launched the European Cybercrime Centre (EC3), which is aiming to tackle cybercrime:

- committed by organised groups to generate large criminal profits, such as online fraud
- causing serious harm to the victim, such as online child sexual exploitation
- affecting critical infrastructure and information systems in the EU

Malmström assumed the duties of EU Commissioner for Trade on 1 November 2014, as a member of the Juncker Commission.

=== European Commissioner for Trade, 2014–2019 ===
In July 2014, Swedish prime minister Fredrik Reinfeldt nominated Malmström for a second term as European Commissioner. By September, the European Parliament gave its support to her nomination. She assumed the duties of EU Commissioner for Trade on 1 November 2014, as a member of the Juncker Commission.

Already in her nomination hearing, amid the Russo-Ukrainian War, Malmström rejected Russia's demands for amendments to a free-trade agreement between the EU and Ukraine. In December 2015, she failed in her final attempt to reach a breakthrough over Russia's concerns, some of which were contrary to European and World Trade Organization rules.

The mission letter for Malmström's position also included, as one of her key duties, the "successful conclusion" of the controversial trade negotiations with the US, the Transatlantic Trade and Investment Partnership (TTIP), though with a number of restrictions and confinements to the negotiation mandate to address European public concerns over TTIP. Having expressed a view strongly in favour of the treaty, she tried to revive the negotiations with the USA two weeks after entering office. Despite claims of an "unprecedented level of transparency", the treaty drafts could not be read by all parliaments of EU member states, such as the German Bundestag, or political leaders such as then-vice chancellor Sigmar Gabriel.

In May 2015, Malmström and Turkish Economy Minister Nihat Zeybekci announced a framework for broadening the European Union–Turkey Customs Union, extending it to include services, government contracting and most agricultural goods. Also under her leadership, the EU finalized the negotiations on a major trade agreement with Vietnam in August 2015, removing 99 per cent of tariffs between Europe and Vietnam over the following decade as well as non-tariff barriers to trade, services, investment, intellectual property, sanitary and phytosanitary measures, government procurement, dispute settlement and sustainable development.

== Later career ==
Since 2019, Malmström has been a visiting professor at the School of Business, Economics and Law at the University of Gothenburg. Also since 2019, she has been serving on the Transatlantic Task Force of the German Marshall Fund and the Federal Chancellor Helmut Schmidt Foundation (BKHS), co-chaired by Karen Donfried and Wolfgang Ischinger.

In September 2020, the government of Prime Minister Stefan Löfven nominated Malmström as Sweden's candidate for secretary general of the Organisation for Economic Co-operation and Development (OECD). During the selection process, she became a finalist but ultimately lost out against Mathias Cormann in March 2021.

From 2021 to 2022, Malmström was a member of the Trilateral Commission’s Task Force on Global Capitalism in Transition, chaired by Carl Bildt, Kelly Grier and Takeshi Niinami.

In 2022, Malmström joined the Brussels office of law firm Covington & Burling as senior advisor. Since 2023, she has been part of the Centre for European Policy Studies/Heinrich Böll Foundation High-Level Group on Bolstering EU Democracy, chaired by Kalypso Nicolaïdis.

In May 2023, Malmström announced that she had left the Liberals, due to her opposition to the party's cooperation with the far-right Sweden Democrats in the Tidö Agreement.

== Other activities ==
- European Council on Foreign Relations (ECFR), Member
- Friends of Europe, Member of the Board of Trustees (since 2020)
- Migration Policy Institute (MPI), Member of the Board of Trustees (since 2020)
- Transatlantic Leadership Network, Member of the Council of Advisors
- Trilateral Commission, Member of the European Group (since 2020)

== Controversy ==
In a discussion with John Hilary, the executive director of War on Want, which he wrote about in The Independent on 12 October 2015, Malmström reportedly acknowledged "that a trade deal has never inspired such passionate and widespread opposition" and is reported to have commented: "I do not take my mandate from the European people." Malmström later denied having said this, calling it a "fabricated quote" extrapolated from her explanations about the TTIP negotiation mandate, which is determined by the European governments and not by the Europeans themselves. She also argued before the European Parliament that she did take her mandate from the European people since she was approved as Commissioner by the MEPs who represent them. Hilary did not retract his version of the story.

== Personal life ==
Malmström is married and has children. She lives in Brussels, Belgium. She is the author of several books, articles and essays on regional parties, regionalism, Spanish politics, European politics, immigration and terrorism.

== C.V. ==
=== Education ===
- 1991: University degree, University of Gothenburg
- PhD (1998) in political science, University of Gothenburg

=== Career ===
- 1989–1992: Psychiatric nurse, Lillhagen Hospital
- 1991–1992: Teacher of social studies, municipal adult education service
- 1992–1999: Researcher at University of Gothenburg
- 1998–2001: Member of Västra Götaland regional council
- 1999–2006: Member of the European Parliament
- since 1999: Member of the Swedish Institute for International Affairs (Utrikespolitiska Institutet)
- 1999–2006: Member of the EP Committee on Foreign Affairs
- 1999–2004: Member of the EP Committee on Constitutional Affairs
- 1999–2004: Vice-Chairwoman of the EP Delegation to the EU-Hungary Joint Parliamentary Committee
- 1999–2006: Member of the ELDR/ALDE Group Bureau
- 2002–2004: ELDR Group spokeswoman on foreign affairs
- 2006–2010: Minister of European Affairs in Sweden
- 2010–2014: European Commissioner for Home Affairs Barroso II Commission
- 2014–2019: European Commissioner for Trade Juncker Commission
- since 2019: Member of the Transatlantic Task Force of the German Marshall Fund and the Bundeskanzler-Helmut-Schmidt-Stiftung (BKHS)

Political offices
Preceded by Bosse Ringholm as Minister for Government Coordination	Minister for European Union Affairs; 2006–2010	Succeeded by Birgitta Ohlsson
Preceded by Jan Kohout	President of the Council of the European Union; 2009–2010	Succeeded by Miguel Ángel Moratinos
Preceded by Margot Wallström	Swedish European Commissioner; 2010–2019	Succeeded by Ylva Johansson
Preceded by Jacques Barrot as European Commissioner for Justice, Freedom and Security	European Commissioner for Home Affairs; 2010–2014	Succeeded by Dimitris Avramopoulos as European Commissioner for Migration, Home Affairs and Citizenship
Preceded by Karel De Gucht	European Commissioner for Trade; 2014–2019	Succeeded by Phil Hogan
