= Jacques Barrot =

French politician (1937–2014)

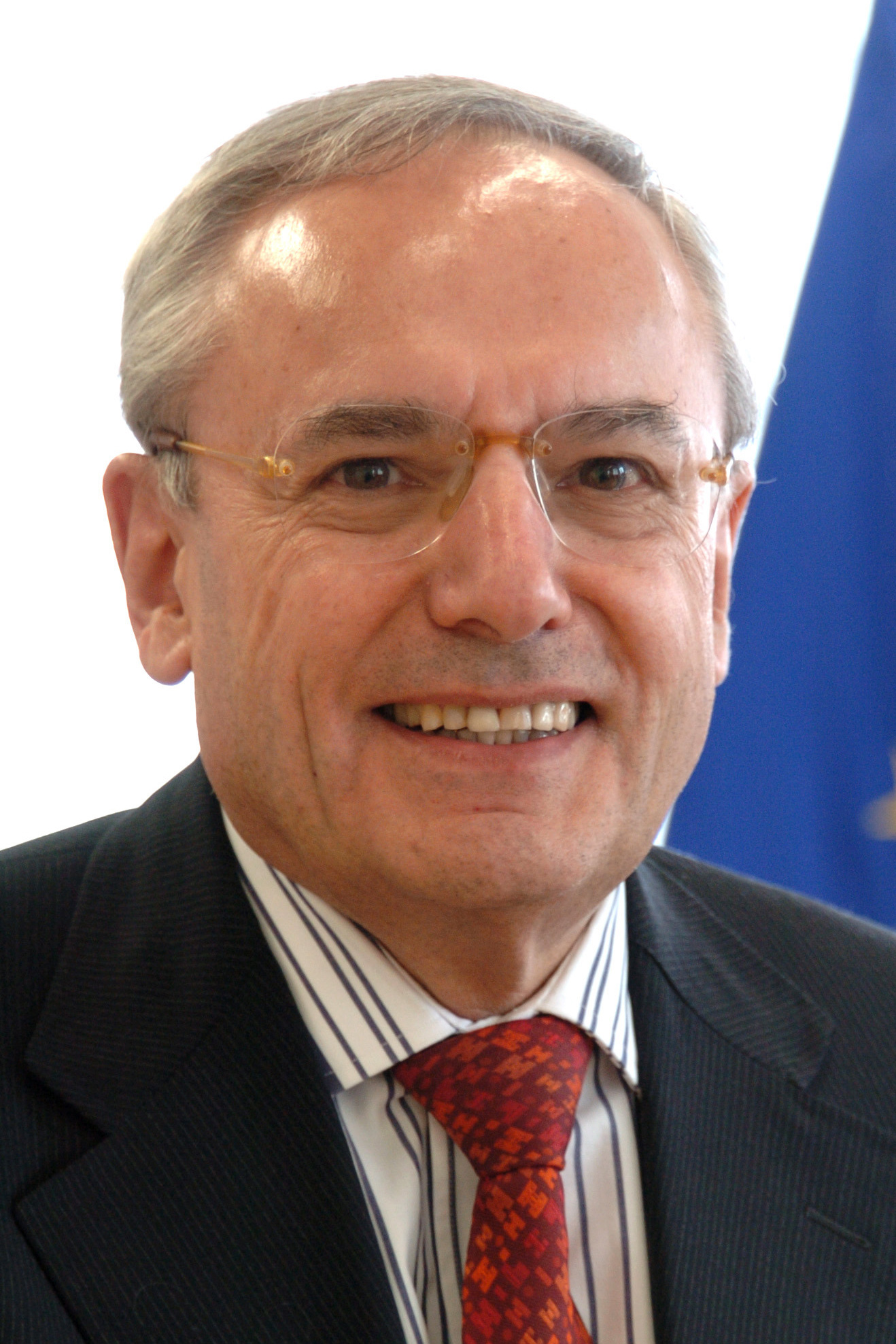
- Barrot in 2004

European Commissioner for Justice, Freedom & Security
- In office 9 May 2008 – 9 February 2010
- President: José Manuel Barroso
- Preceded by: Franco Frattini
- Succeeded by: Viviane Reding (Justice, Fundamental Rights and Citizenship); Cecilia Malmström (Home Affairs)

European Commissioner for Transport
- In office 22 November 2004 – 9 May 2008
- President: José Manuel Barroso
- Preceded by: Loyola de Palacio (Energy and Transport)
- Succeeded by: Antonio Tajani

European Commissioner for Regional Policy
- In office 1 April 2004 – 22 November 2004
- President: Romano Prodi
- Preceded by: Michel Barnier
- Succeeded by: Danuta Hübner

Member of the Constitutional Council
- In office 12 March 2010 – 3 December 2014
- Appointed by: Bernard Accoyer
- President: Jean-Louis Debré
- Preceded by: Pierre Joxe
- Succeeded by: Lionel Jospin

Minister of Labour
- In office 18 May 1995 – 2 June 1997
- President: Jacques Chirac
- Prime Minister: Alain Juppé
- Preceded by: Michel Giraud
- Succeeded by: Martine Aubry

Minister of Health
- In office 4 July 1979 – 13 May 1981
- President: Valéry Giscard d'Estaing
- Prime Minister: Raymond Barre
- Preceded by: Simone Veil
- Succeeded by: Edmond Hervé

Member of the National Assembly for Haute-Loire's 1st constituency
- In office 1 January 1997 – 4 July 2004
- Preceded by: Serge Monnier
- Succeeded by: Laurent Wauquiez

Personal details
- Born: 3 February 1937 Yssingeaux, France
- Died: 3 December 2014 (aged 77) Neuilly-sur-Seine, France
- Party: UDF (before 2002); UMP (2002–2014)
- Children: 3, including Jean-Noël Barrot
- Education: Aix-Marseille University; Sciences Po

Jacques Barrot (French pronunciation: [ʒak baʁo]; 3 February 1937 – 3 December 2014) was a French politician who served in the European Commission as Commissioner for Justice, Freedom and Security (2008–2010), Commissioner for Transport (2004–2008) and Commissioner for Regional Policy (2004). He was also one of the vice-presidents of the Barroso Commission. In France, he held several ministerial posts and was later a member of the Constitutional Council from 2010 until his death in 2014.

== European Commissioner ==
Barrot joined the Prodi Commission in April 2004 as Commissioner for Regional Policy, before moving in November 2004 to become Commissioner for Transport and a vice-president in the first Barroso Commission. In May 2008, following Franco Frattini’s departure from the Commission, Barrot took over the Justice, Freedom and Security portfolio. On 18 June 2008 the European Parliament held hearings on the reshuffle and approved the related changes; on the same day MEPs also voted to appoint Antonio Tajani as Transport Commissioner. He remained Commissioner until February 2010, when the second Barroso Commission took office and the portfolio was split between Viviane Reding (Justice, Fundamental Rights and Citizenship) and Cecilia Malmström (Home Affairs).

== National politics ==
Barrot served several terms as a deputy for Haute-Loire (1967–1974, 1981–1995, 1997–2004) and presided over the Haute-Loire General Council (1976–2001). He was Minister of Health (1979–1981) and Minister of Labour (1995–1997).

== Conviction and amnesty ==
In 2000 Barrot received an eight-month suspended sentence for illegal party funding related to the CDS; the sentence concerned acts covered by a 1995 presidential amnesty, which expunged the conviction under French law. The European Parliament’s legal service accepted that he was not legally required to disclose an amnestied conviction during his 2004 hearing. This came after the UK Independence Party leader Nigel Farage revealed the conviction in a statement in the European Parliament.

== Constitutional Council and death ==
Barrot was appointed to the Constitutional Council on 12 March 2010 and served until his death on 3 December 2014 in Neuilly-sur-Seine.

== Honours ==
- Officer of the Legion of Honour (2011).

Political offices
Preceded by Pascal Lamy	French European Commissioner; 2004–2010	Succeeded by Michel Barnier
Preceded by Michel Barnier	European Commissioner for Regional Policy; 2004	Succeeded by Danuta Hübner
Preceded by Loyola de Palacio as European Commissioner for Energy and Transport	European Commissioner for Transport; 2004–2008	Succeeded by Antonio Tajani
Preceded by Franco Frattini	European Commissioner for Justice, Freedom & Security; 2008–2010	Succeeded by Viviane Reding as European Commissioner for Justice, Fundamental Rights and Citizenship
Preceded by Franco Frattini	European Commissioner for Justice, Freedom & Security; 2008–2010	Succeeded by Cecilia Malmström as European Commissioner for Home Affairs
Legal offices
Preceded by Pierre Joxe	Member of the Constitutional Council; 2010–2014	Succeeded by Lionel Jospin
