= Directorate-General for Justice and Home Affairs =

The Directorate-General for Justice and Home Affairs (DG JAI) is a directorate-general of the General Secretariat of the Council of the European Union that prepares the work and tasks of the Justice and Home Affairs Council. It is headed by the Director-General for Justice and Home Affairs.

== Structure ==
The DG JHA encompasses 2 Directorates, both headquartered in Brussels, Belgium:

- A: Home affairs
- B: Justice

== See also ==
- European Commission
  - Directorate-General for Justice and Consumers
  - Directorate-General for Migration and Home Affairs
