= Hadja Lahbib =

Belgian politician (born 1970)

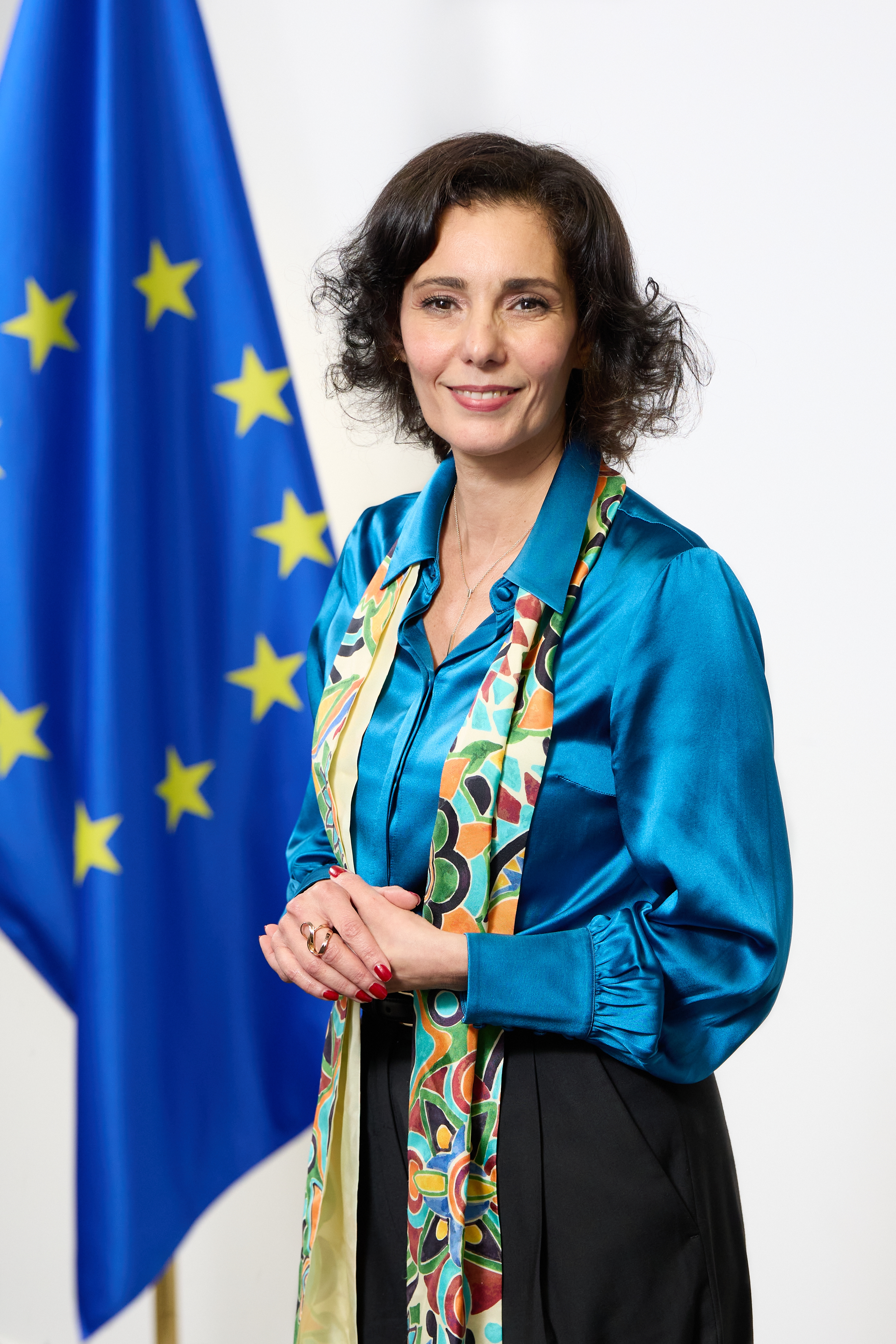
- Official portrait, 2024

European Commissioner for Preparedness, Crisis Management and Equality
- Incumbent
- Assumed office 1 December 2024
- Commission: Von der Leyen II
- Preceded by: Janez Lenarčič (Crisis Management); Helena Dalli (Equality)

Minister of Foreign Affairs
- In office 15 July 2022 – 30 November 2024
- Prime Minister: Alexander De Croo
- Preceded by: Sophie Wilmès
- Succeeded by: Bernard Quintin

Personal details
- Born: 21 June 1970 (age 56) Boussu, Belgium
- Party: MR (2022–present)
- Spouse: Olivier Lemaire
- Children: 2
- Education: Université libre de Bruxelles
- Occupation: Politician; Journalist; Presenter

Hadja Lahbib (French pronunciation: [adʒa labib]; born 21 June 1970) is a Belgian journalist, television presenter, director and politician, who has been serving as the European Commissioner for Preparedness and Crisis Management and Commissioner for Equality since 1 December 2024. Prior to that, she served as the Belgian Minister of Foreign Affairs from July 2022 to 30 November 2024.

== Early life ==
Hadja Lahbib was born on 21 June 1970 in Boussu, near the city of Mons, to a Francophone family of Algerian Kabyles. Her parents are practising Muslims, but she says she is more attracted to Buddhism.

=== Career as a journalist ===
Lahbib graduated in journalism from the Free University of Brussels and worked for a long time for the Belgian Radio-Television of the French Community (RTBF). In particular, she was a special correspondent in Afghanistan and the Middle East, and presented the television news for two decades.

=== Journey to Crimea as a journalist ===
Before starting her political career, Hadja Lahbib visited the politically disputed Crimea between Russia and Ukraine in July 2021. She went to the "Global Values" festival, which is organized by the Sevastopol Academic Russian Drama Theater named after Lunacharsky and organized by Katerina Tikhonova, daughter of Vladimir Putin. In 2021, it was held on 23–25 July. On Instagram, she published fragments of a choreographic performance from the festival. After the trip, she was asked by RTBF whether she was coming back from Russia or Ukraine. Lahbib did not answer clearly but said: "To land at Simferopol airport, a Russian visa is required."

== Political career ==
=== Minister of Foreign Affairs ===
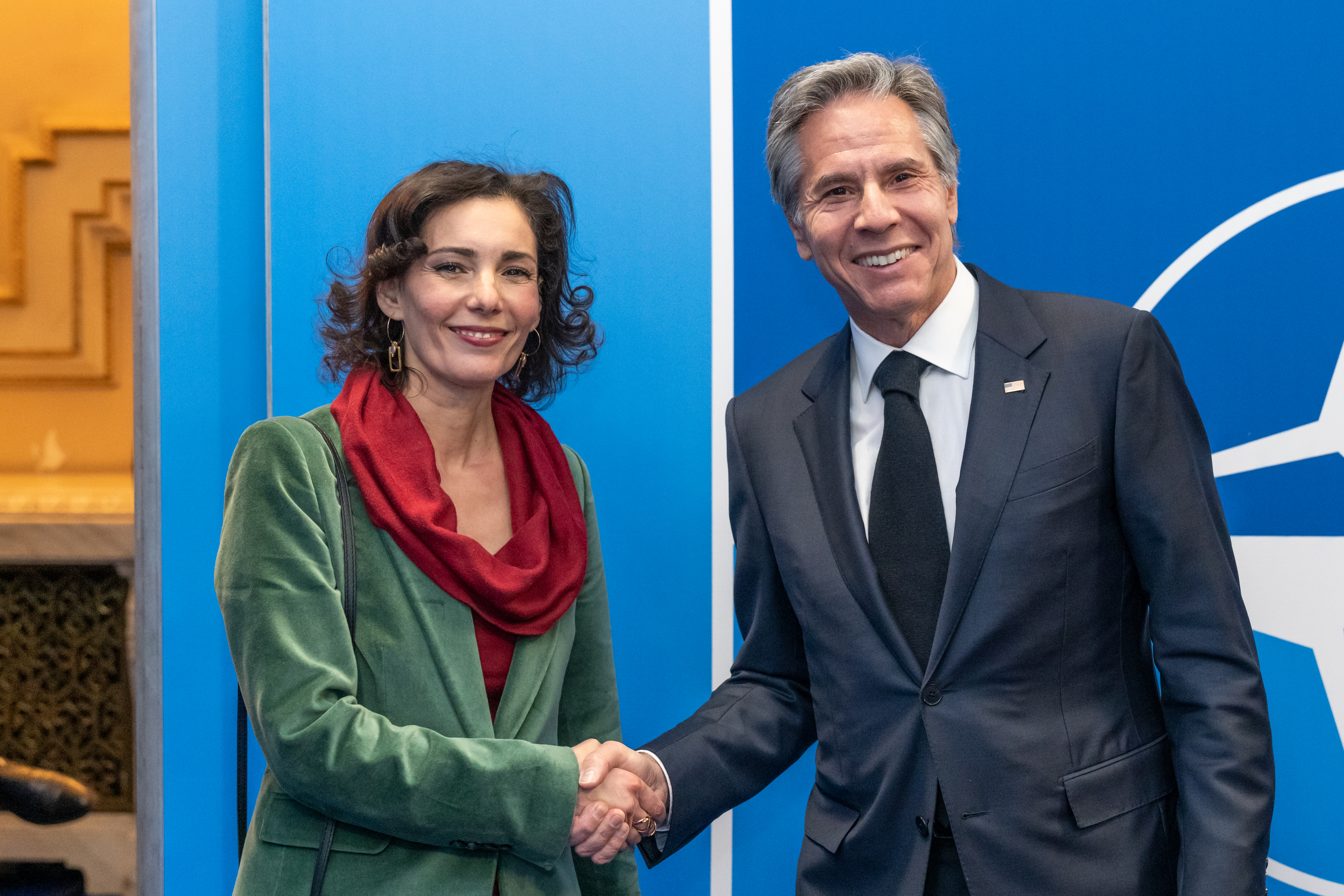
Lahbib with US Secretary of State Antony Blinken, 30 November 2022

Hadja Lahbib was appointed foreign minister on 15 July 2022. Prior to this nomination, Lahbib was not a member of the liberal Reformist Movement (MR), whose leader Georges-Louis Bouchez unexpectedly nominated her for the post of Belgian Federal Minister for Foreign Affairs to replace Sophie Wilmès. She took the oath before King Philippe on the same day. At the press conference at which she was introduced, she said about her political position:

"I am not left, not right, but fundamentally free".

After the interview, Georges-Louis Bouchez asked her to join MR, and she did so. Since then, she has repeatedly declared herself to be fully liberal.

In her capacity as Foreign Minister, she condemned Russia's invasion of Ukraine, expressed full support for Ukraine and called the occupation of Crimea illegal. In a letter addressed to the Ukrainian Minister of Foreign Affairs on 28 July 2022, she expressed her support for Ukraine and described Russia's occupation of Crimea as "illegal." Dmytro Kuleba, her counterpart at the time, acknowledged "Belgium's sincere and loyal commitment to Ukraine's territorial integrity."

On 7 October 2022, Lahbib and two lawmakers—Darya Safai and Goedele Liekens—cut their hair in parliament in solidarity with anti-government demonstrations in Iran triggered by the death of Mahsa Amini, a 22-year-old woman, in police custody.

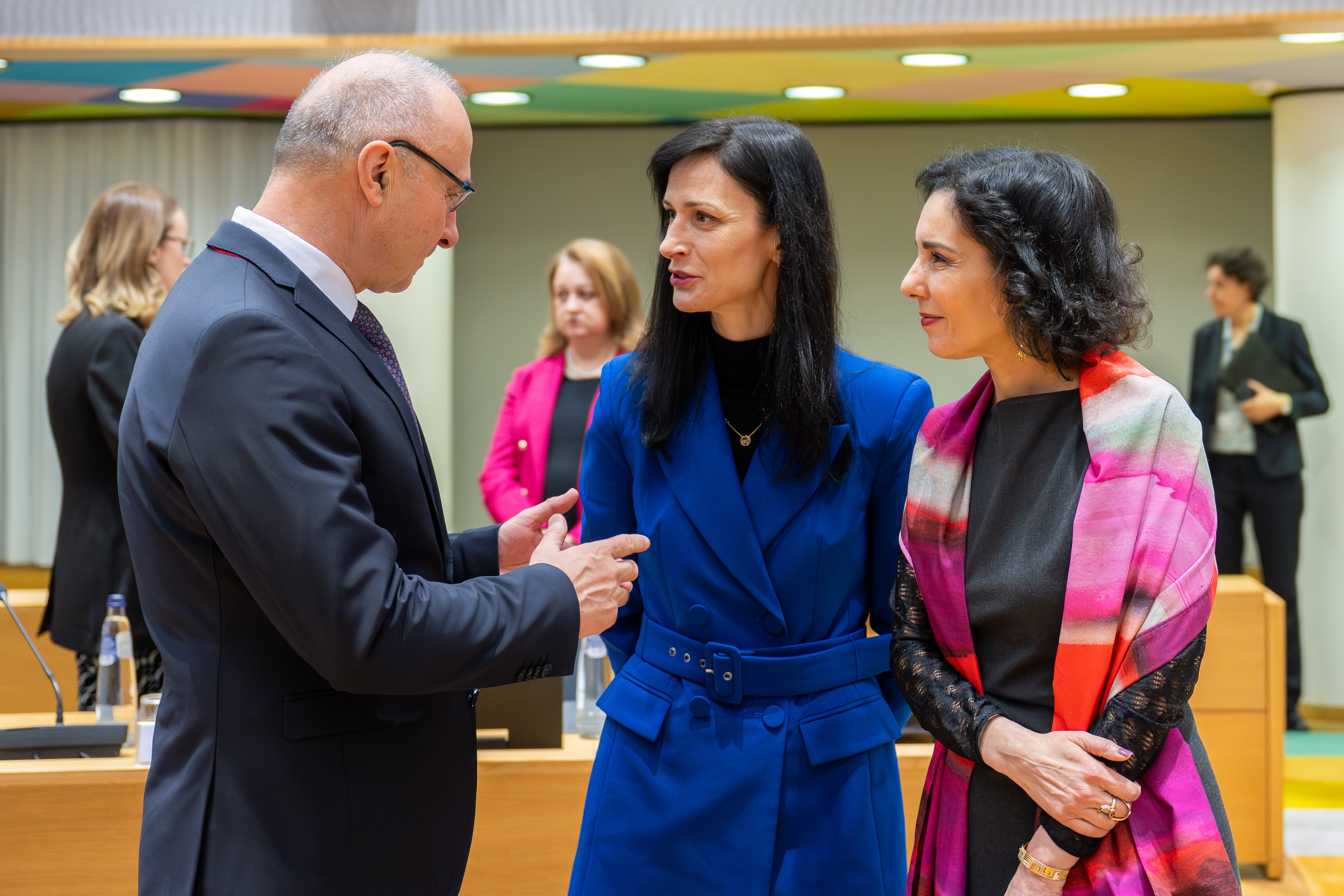
Lahbib with Mariya Gabriel in 2024

On 26 November 2022, Lahbib and prime minister Alexander De Croo visited Ukraine.

In September 2023, MR, through the voices of Hadja Lahbib and David Clarinval, asked the Ministry of Defense to reconsider the possibility of delivering F-16s to Ukraine. Hadja Lahbib explained, “The best way to protect Belgium is by sending F-16s to Ukraine.”

On 7 October, Hadja Lahbib swiftly condemned the October 7 attacks carried out by Hamas and Palestinian Islamic Jihad against Israel. Since that day, the Ministry of Foreign Affairs has been calling for the release of all hostages.

In May 2024, during Ukrainian President Volodymyr Zelenskyy's visit to Belgium, the Minister of Foreign Affairs announced that 30 F-16 fighter jets would be delivered to Ukraine by 2028.

During the Belgian presidency of Europe during the first semester of 2024, she urged to "deprive Hungary – which took over the presidency in July – of voting rights" in the European Union.

In July 2024, she criticized Israel's occupation of the Palestinian territories, saying that "Belgium will always stand up for the respect of international law." In August 2024, she "strongly" condemned the Al-Tabaeen school attack in Gaza by Israel.

==== Issues ====
In June 2023, Lahbib won a vote of no confidence in parliament after granting visas to delegations from Iranian and Russian cities, including the mayor of Tehran (known as the "butcher of Tehran"), to attend a mayors' convention in Brussels earlier that month. Her MR party had threatened to leave the government if she were forced to resign, which would have led the government to collapse.

In November 2022, she met with the Qatari labor minister Ali bin Samikh Al Marri, who is accused of corruption, to discuss human rights, women's rights, and LGBTQ rights in Qatar.

=== European Commissioner ===
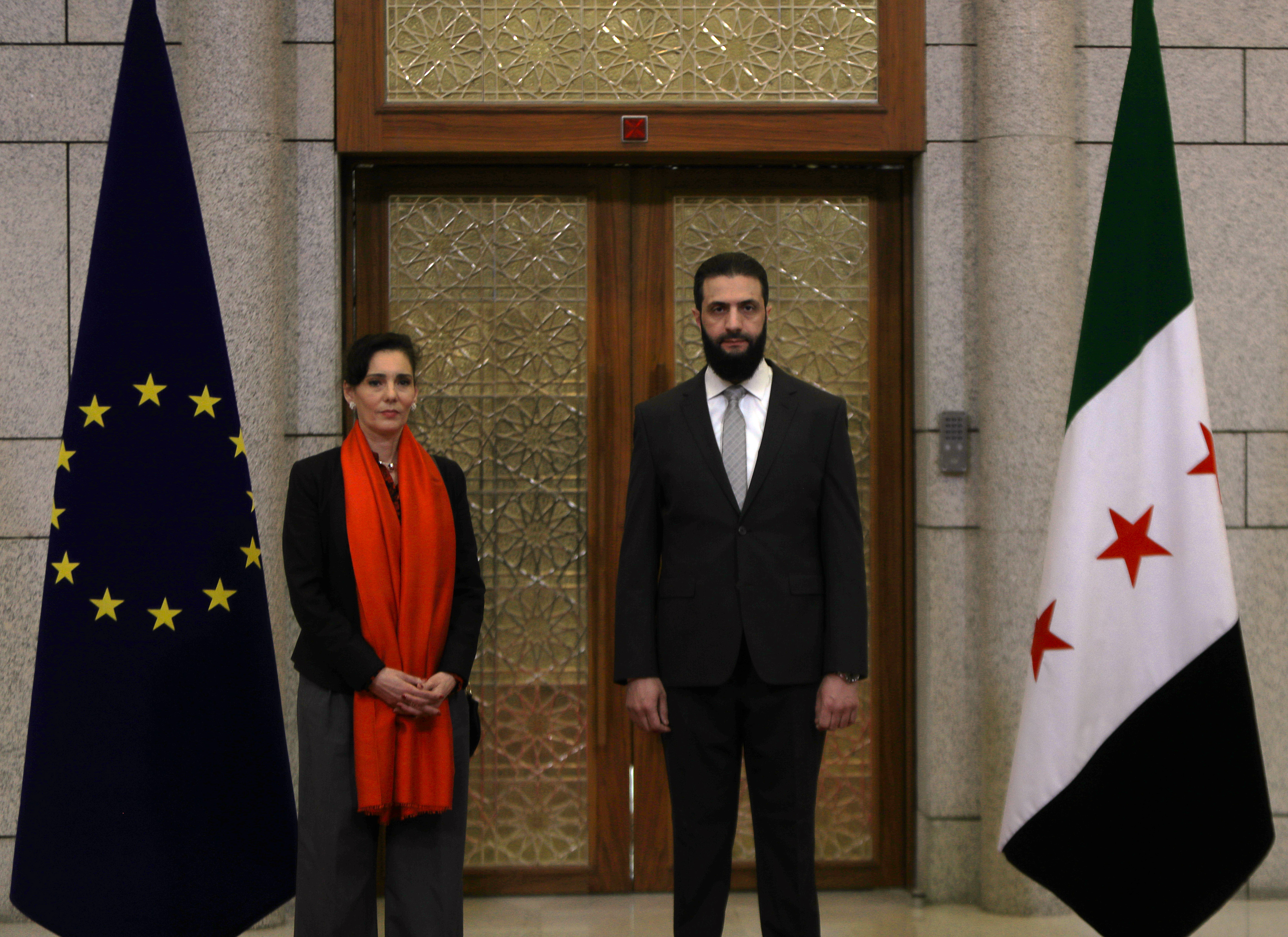
Lahbib with Syrian President Ahmed al-Sharaa in Damascus, Syria, 17 January 2025

The president of the MR-party, Georges-Louis Bouchez, proposed Lahbib as Belgian candidate to replace Didier Reynders for the second Von der Leyen Commission after missing the 31 August deadline previously set by the President of the Commission. Lahbib's nomination fulfilled a specific request from President von der Leyen, who had emphasised the importance of Member State governments proposing female candidates.

On 17 September 2024, Ursula von der Leyen nominated Hadja Lahbib as the European Commissioner for Preparedness, Crisis Management, and Equality. She assumed her European Commissioner role on 1 December 2024.

Her first bilateral visit as Commissioner was to Ukraine. In January 2025, she met with Syrian President Ahmed al-Sharaa.

On 28 October 2025, Lahbib and Kaja Kallas released a joint statement calling the RSF's seizure of El Fasher a "dangerous turning point" in the Sudanese Civil War and condemning the "brutality" of targeting civilians based on ethnicity. They urged immediate de-escalation, adherence to international humanitarian law, and safe, unhindered humanitarian access.

== Works ==
- Afghanistan, le choix des femmes, 2007, 55 min. A portrait of two leading female figures from the Afghan landscape. Nominated for the Albert Londres Prize.
- Le cou et la tête, 2008, 26 min. Documentary about the women's village Umoja in northern Kenya.
- Patience, patience, t'iras au paradis, 2014, 85 min. Documentary about six immigrant women in Belgium. The movie won the prestigious Iris Europa Award 2015.

== Honors and awards ==
=== State decorations ===
- Order of Orange-Nassau
- Order of Merit of the Grand Duchy of Luxembourg

=== Awards and prizes ===
- Honorary citizenship of Liège (2011)
- Bruxelloise de l’année (2013)
- Dunia African Award (2019)

Political offices
Preceded by Sophie Wilmès	Minister of Foreign Affairs; 2022–2024	Succeeded by Bernard Quintin
