= Public Register of Travel and Identity Documents Online =

Online repository of security features in travel documents

The Public Register of Authentic Travel and Identity Documents Online (PRADO) is an online repository of security features in travel documents maintained by the Council of the European Union. It contains information on some of the most important security features of identity and travel documents of countries within the European Union, all Schengen Area countries, of other neighbouring countries, and third countries worldwide.

PRADO is hosted by the General Secretariat of the Council of the European Union (GSC), Directorate General for Justice and Home Affairs (DGD 1A).

== History ==
With Council Joint Action 98/700/JHA on 3 December 1998, the European Image Archiving System "FADO" (False and Authentic Documents Online) was set up.

The first part of the system, "Expert FADO", went online at the end of 2004 for secure communication among document experts.

In 2007, iFADO ("intranet FADO") and PRADO were released. iFADO contains the most important information from "Expert FADO" for access restricted, governmental use, while in PRADO a small subset of this information is published for the general public.

== Content ==
PRADO contains basic technical descriptions, including information on security features, of authentic identity and travel documents. The information is selected and provided by document experts in the member states of the European Union (EU), Iceland, Norway, Switzerland and the United Kingdom; part of the information contained in the classified, restricted "Expert FADO" system is made publicly available via the PRADO pages. The steering committee in the Council of the European Union is currently the Working Party on Frontiers in the formation of False Document Experts.

Information on practically all important documents of all EU and Schengen countries is present. The overall number of described documents of third countries however differs widely from country to country as information is added every week.

On PRADO, users can find links to websites with lists of travel documents which are officially recognised by EU member states and Schengen states and information on invalid document numbers provided by some EU Member States as well as by third countries. Users can also access information related to identity checking, document checking, and document fraud.

== Categorisation ==
The travel and identity documents in PRADO are categorised as follows:

=== Document categories ===
- A Passport (national passports – all types)
- B Identity card
- C Visa (necessary to enter a country)
- E Entry paper (re-entry for own & other EU nationals)
- F Driving licence
- G Vehicle licence / log book
- H Residence permit
- I Seafarers' identity document
- J Travel Document issued to non-nationals
- K Train driving licence
- L Crew Member Certificate / Pilot's Licence
- M Certificate for operators of pleasure crafts / Captain's licence
- S Special authorization card
- V Authorisation to represent a company
- W Work permit
- X Other (travel and identity related) document
- D Stamp (passport stamps)
- P Civil status document

=== Document types ===
- O Ordinary
- D Diplomatic
- S Service/Official
- F Military
- P Emergency / Provisional
- Y Related / associated document
- E Entry stamp
- X Exit stamp

=== Document types of civil status documents ===
- B Birth
- N Nationality / Citizenship
- I Social security card / Tax card
- A Adoption
- M Marriage
- U Registered partnership
- R Divorce
- T Death certificate

== Languages ==
PRADO is available in all 24 official languages of the European Union. Documents are introduced by document experts in the currently 31 participating countries in any of the languages and the standardised descriptions are translated automatically; thus, documents are immediately available in all supported languages. Additional free text information contained is translated online by specialised linguists of the General Secretariat of the Council of the European Union.

== Target audience ==
The website is published by the General Secretariat of the Council of the European Union not only for transparency reasons, but also to provide an important service to many users in Europe, especially to non-governmental organisations with a need or legal obligation to check identities, for example:

- Banks and credit institutions
- Employers
- Mobile network operators
- Notaries and lawyers
- Postal services
- Security and guarding companies
- Car rental companies and agencies

== See also ==
- FADO
- Europa
- Identity document
- Passports of the European Union
- National identity cards in the European Economic Area
