= Stockholm Programme =

The Stockholm Programme was a five-year plan with guidelines for justice and home affairs of the member states of the European Union for the years 2010 through 2014. It had been prepared by the Swedish Presidency of the Council of the European Union for its informal meeting held on 15-17 July 2009, and was named after the place of its publication (Stockholm, the capital of Sweden). After decisions-making by the ministers of the interior and the ministers for justice on 1 December 2009, it was presented to the European Council on 10th and 11th of that month for the final referendum on its summit in Brussels.

== Background ==
After the Tampere Programme of 1999 and the Hague Programme of 2004, the Stockholm Programme was the third programme covering the areas of freedom, security and justice adopted by the states of the European Union.

== Contents ==
The programme contains guidelines for a common politics on the topics of protection of fundamental rights, privacy, minority rights and rights of groups of people in need of special protection, as well as a citizenship of the European Union. In the programme there are also plans for a new European security architecture through the extension of cooperation in the areas of police, military and secret services and measures in the area of border-crossing data exchange between state authorities and surveillance of the internet.

It touches a variety of policy areas including homeland and public security, migration (the European pact on immigration and asylum), the combat against organized crime, personal data protection, family law, private law, inheritance law and others.

There is supposed to be expansion of Europol and Eurojust, the establishing of interoperability of police databases, a centralised resident register, improved satellite surveillance, joined deportation planes and flights, new refugee camps outside the EU territory, usage of the military against immigration, police intervention outside of EU territory, expansion of the European Gendarmerie Force and intensified cooperation of secret services, etc..

The Stockholm Programme also includes support for the ongoing Prague Process, stating that the memory of totalitarian crimes "must be a collective memory, shared and promoted, where possible, by us all", and emphasizing that "the Union is an area of shared values, values which are incompatible with crimes against humanity, genocide and war crimes, including crimes committed by totalitarian regimes".

== Literature ==
- The Stockholm Programme: An open and secure Europe serving the citizen, Draft, 16th Oktober 2009 (PDF file, 765 KB). OpenDocument Text, (ODF file; 93 KB).
- European Civil Liberties Network: Statement by the European Civil Liberties Network* on the new EU five-year plan on Justice and Home Affairs. April 2009. (PDF file, 44 KB)
- Federal Trust: More than Just a five-year itch?.
- Centre for European Reform: Seven sins of Stockholm.
- German Institute for International and Security Affairs: Reprogramming EU home affairs.
- Say No to Stockholm: noblogs.org
