= European Commissioner for Equality =

Member of the EU Commission

European Commissioner of Equality
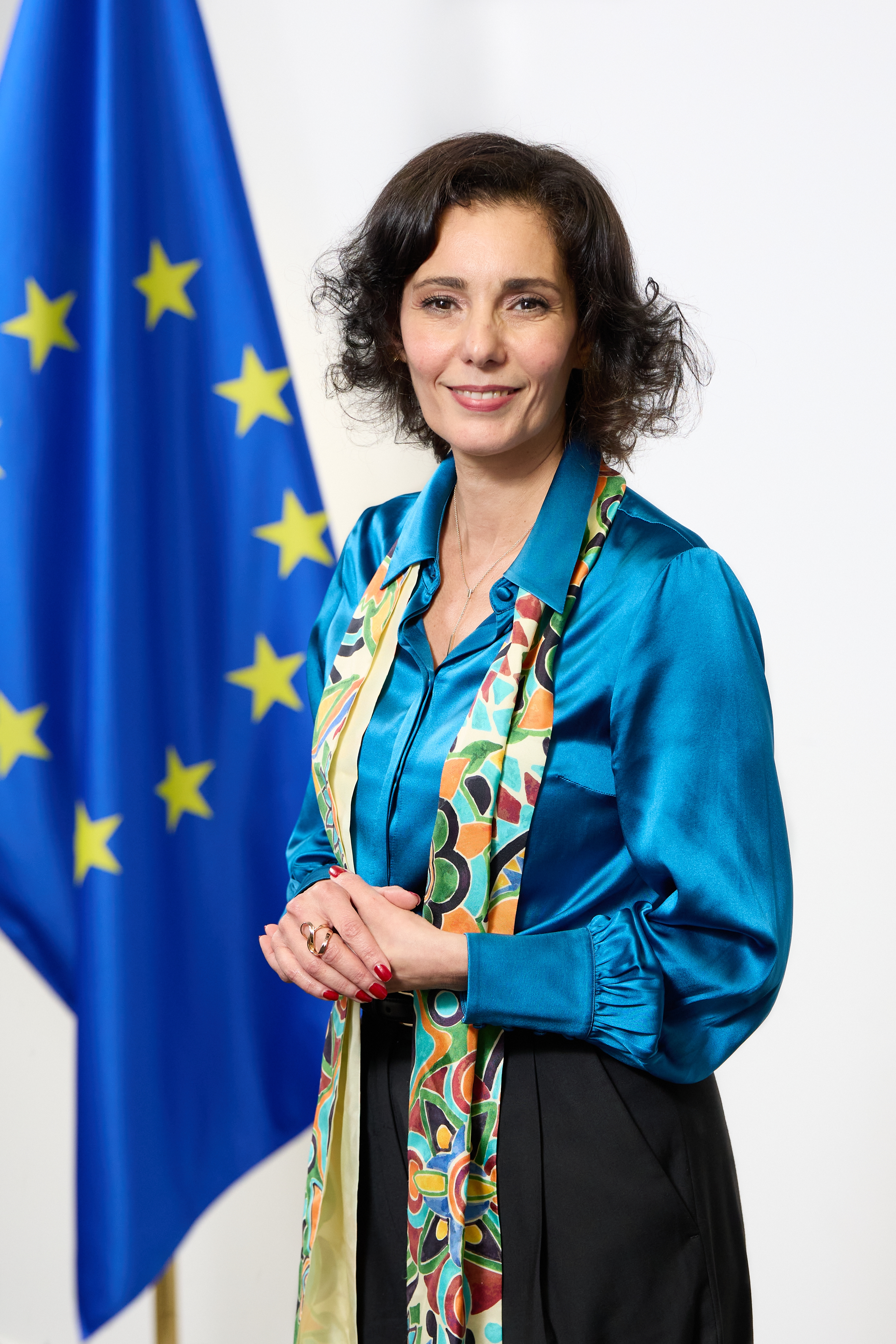
- Incumbent; Hadja Lahbib since 1 December 2024
- Appointer: President of the European Commission
- Term length: 5 years
- Precursor: Helena Dalli

The European Commissioner for Equality is a post in the European Commission. The portfolio was previously combined with Justice as Commissioner for Justice, Consumers and Gender Equality under commissioner is Věra Jourová; however, the two portfolios were split in December 2019. The current holder is Hadja Lahbib.

Hadja Lahbib also serves as Commissioner for Preparedness and Crisis Management.

== Portfolio ==
The post was created in 2010 by splitting the previous Justice, Freedom and Security portfolio into a justice post (the subject covered here) and a security post: the Commissioner for Home Affairs. This split was made as a concession to the liberals in the European Parliament to gain their support for the second Barroso Commission.

== List of Commissioners ==
| # | Name | Country | Period | Commission |
|---|---|---|---|---|
| 1 | Helena Dalli | Malta | 2019–2024 | von der Leyen I |
| 2 | Hadja Lahbib | Belgium | 2024–2029 | von der Leyen II |
