= European Judicial Network =

Network of legal contact points within the EU

The European Judicial Network (EJN) is a network of contact points within the EU designed to facilitate judicial cooperation across borders. With a focus on serious crime (such as organized crime, corruption, drug smuggling and terrorism), it helps form and maintain contacts between agencies in member states.

The Network was created by Joint Action 98/428 in 1998, to fulfil recommendation no. 21 of the Action Plan to Combat Organised Crime adopted by the Council of the European Union on 28 April 1997.

A priority of the EJN is the dissemination of information to its citizens, judges and legal practitioners, primarily through its Web site. The EJN's main functions are: Facilitating judicial cooperation among the Member States; travelling to meet the contact points of other State Members, as necessary; providing the local judicial authorities of their country with the necessary legal and practical information; providing the local judicial authorities of other member states the necessary legal and practical information; improving the coordination of the judicial cases.

A member state's Contact Point can identify relevant other Contact Points via the European Justice Atlas.

The secretariat of the EJN functions as an independent autonomous unit within the staff of Eurojust, based in The Hague in the Netherlands.
