= FADO =

European image-archiving system for identity documents

FADO (which stands for "False and Authentic Documents Online") is a European image-archiving system that was set up to help combat illegal immigration and organised crime. It was established by a Joint Action of the Council of the European Union enacted in 1998.

== Background ==
The proliferation of genuine and false documents means that frequent updating is essential. Ever more sophisticated techniques are being used to produce both genuine documents and forgeries. A computerised system with restricted access has therefore been built that enables fast and secure information exchange between the General Secretariat of the Council of the European Union and between document experts in the European Union member states, Iceland, Norway and Switzerland.

== Database contents ==
The database established by the FADO Joint Acts includes the following data:

- images of genuine documents,
- information on security techniques (security features),
- images of typical false and forged documents,
- information on forgery techniques, and
- statistics on detected false and falsified documents and identity fraud.

FADO is currently available to document experts in 31 FADO partner states: in all member states of the European Union (EU) and in Iceland, Norway and Switzerland.

Part of the information shared by document experts in the classified, restricted system, FADO, is made publicly available, via the Public Register of Authentic Documents Online (PRADO) website which is managed by the Council of the European Union.

Document descriptions in FADO are available in all 24 official languages of the European Union. Documents are introduced by document experts in any of the languages and the standardised descriptions are translated automatically; thus, documents are immediately available in all supported languages. Additional free text information contained is translated later on by specialised linguists of the General Secretariat of the Council.

== See also ==
- Europa
- Passports of the European Union
- Identity document
