= Eurojust =

EU criminal law agency

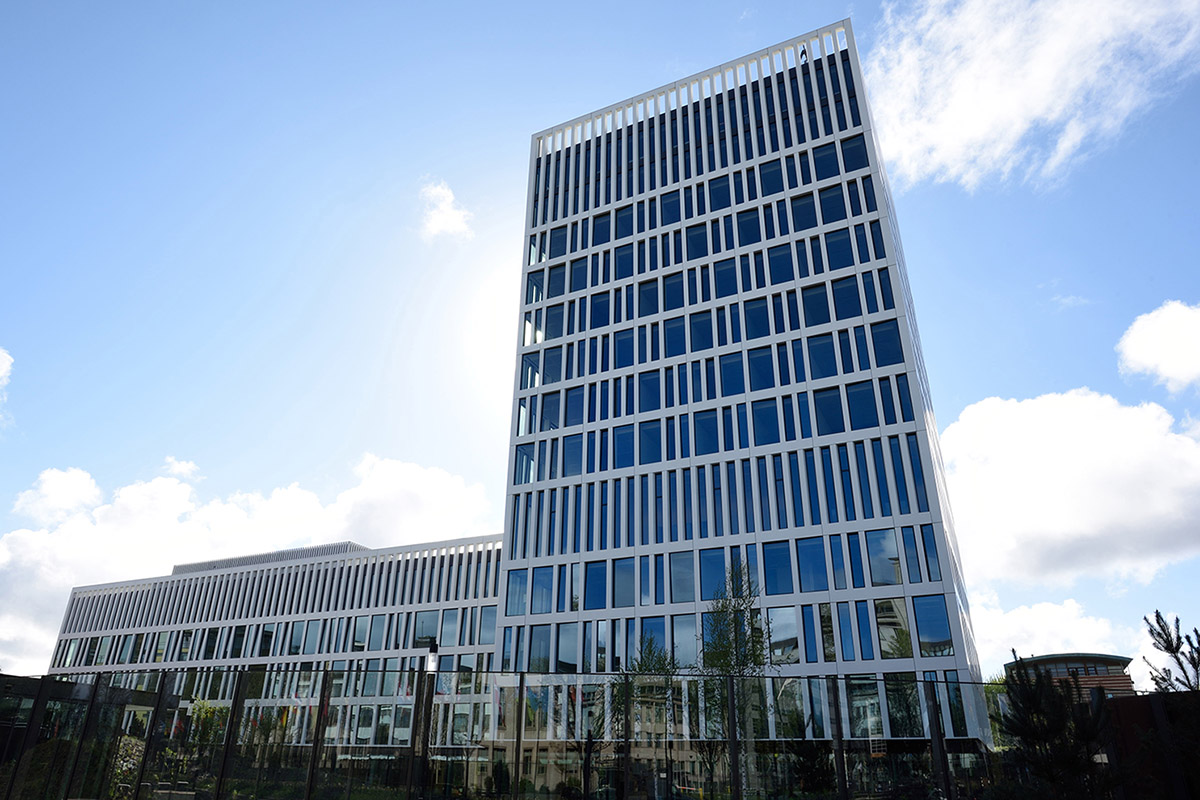
- Eurojust headquarters in the World Forum area of The Hague, the Netherlands

Agency overview
- Formed: 6 March 2002
- Jurisdiction: European Union
- Headquarters: The Hague, Netherlands
- Employees: 265 (2022)
- Annual budget: € 50.2 million (2022)
- Agency executives: (Austria) Michael Schmid, President of Eurojust; (France) Vincent Jamin, Administrative Director
- Key document: Regulation (EU) 2018/1727
- Website: eurojust.europa.eu

Map
- Eurojust (European Union)

The European Union Agency for Criminal Justice Cooperation (Eurojust) is an agency of the European Union (EU) dealing with judicial co-operation in criminal matters among agencies of the member states. It is seated in The Hague, Netherlands. Established in 2002, it was created to improve handling of serious cross-border and organised crime by stimulating investigative and prosecutorial co-ordination.

Eurojust is composed of a college formed of 27 national members—experienced judges, prosecutors, or police officers of equivalent competence from each EU member state. The terms and duties of the members are defined by the state that appoints them. Eurojust also co-operates with third states and other EU bodies such as the European Judicial Network, Europol and OLAF.

== History ==
Eurojust was established as a result of a decision that the European Council of Tampere (15-16 October 1999) made to set up a permanent judicial co-operation unit in order to improve the fight against serious crime. The Treaty of Nice amended the Treaty on the European Union to include a reference to Eurojust. On 14 December 2000, a precursor organization called Pro-Eurojust was created by the Council of the European Union to permit prosecutors to test the Eurojust processes. It began operating in Brussels on 1 March 2001. The terrorist attacks in the U.S. in September of that year demonstrated strongly the need for international cooperation, speeding the development of Eurojust, which was then established in February 2002 by Council Decision 2002/187/JHA. The new organization settled in The Hague on 29 April 2003.

Since its establishment, Eurojust has focused heavily on forging international co-operation agreements and building international contact points, including the basing at Eurojust of several liaison prosecutors (Norway, Switzerland, Montenegro and the United States). In addition to these four nations, it has co-operation agreements with Europol, OLAF, CEPOL, the European Judicial Training Network, UNODC, IberRed, Croatia (before it entered the European Union on 1 July 2013, thus joining EUROJUST), Iceland, and North Macedonia.

The New Council Decision on the Strengthening of Eurojust was signed in July 2008 to enhance Eurojust's cooperation with partners and third States and to generally strengthen its operational capabilities.

Council Decision 2002/187/JHA was completely replaced with Regulation (EU) 2018/1727 which entered into force on the twentieth day following the publication in the Official Journal of the European Union on the 21.11.2018.

== Functions ==
=== Types of crimes and offences ===
According to the Eurojust Decision, Eurojust may act when two or more Member states are affected crimes in which Europol is entitled to act, including organised crime, terrorism and other forms of serious crime (unlawful drug trafficking, illegal moneylaundering activities, crime connected with nuclear and radioactive substances, illegal immigrant smuggling, trafficking in human beings, motor vehicle crime, murder, grievous bodily injury, illicit trade in human organs and tissue, kidnapping, illegal restraint and hostage taking, racism and xenophobia, organised robbery, illicit trafficking in cultural goods, including antiquities and works of art, swindling and fraud, racketeering and extortion, counterfeiting and product piracy, forgery of administrative documents and trafficking therein, forgery of money and means of payment, computer crime, corruption, illicit trafficking in arms, ammunition and explosives, illicit trafficking in endangered animal species, illicit trafficking in endangered plant species and varieties, environmental crime, illicit trafficking in hormonal substances and other growth promoters). It may also act on other types of crime if they are committed together with one of the above or if it is requested by a member state. In 2010, about 10% of the cases handled by Eurojust fell into this category.

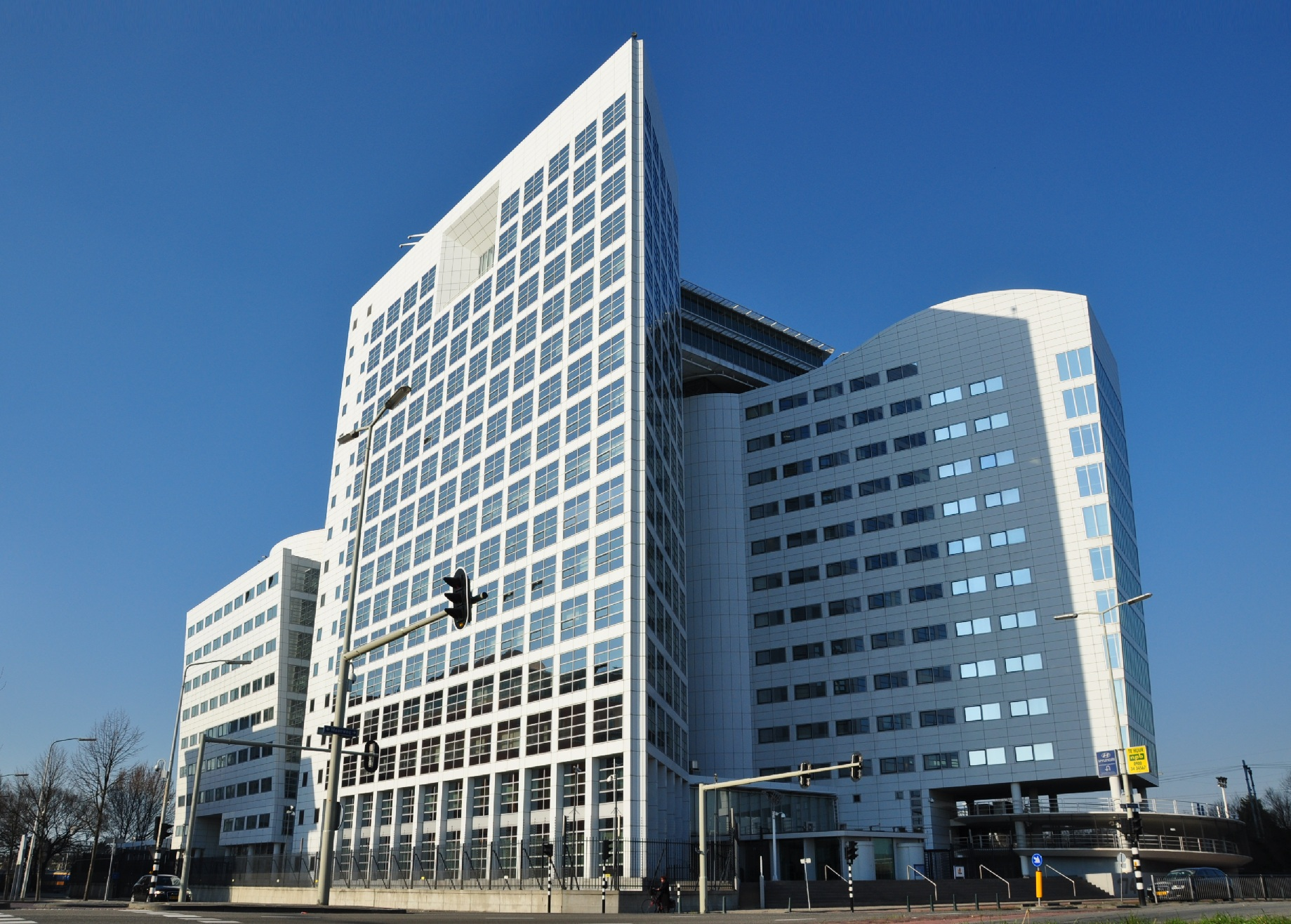
The former Eurojust building in The Hague, formerly the interim HQ of the ICC

Eurojust's primary focus are on crimes that represent a "special threat" to citizens, such as terrorism, drug trafficking, trafficking in human beings, cybercrime, fraud, corruption, money laundering and other economic crime.

=== Tasks ===
Eurojust is not empowered to investigate or prosecute crimes, but instead works to coordinate investigations and prosecutions between the EU Member States when dealing with cross-border crime. They may also assist investigations and prosecutions between a requesting Member State and a non-Member State where a co-operation agreement exists or where there is special need.

Eurojust's tasks may vary depending on whether it is acting a college or through national members. Among other tasks, Eurojust may:

- Ask competent authorities in Member States to investigate or prosecute specific acts, accept that one Member State may be the better jurisdiction for investigation or prosecution, co-ordinate with other Member States, set up a joint investigation team, or supply information to Eurojust;
- Ensure that Member States communicate with one another about relevant investigations and prosecutions;
- Assist Member States in ensuring co-ordination or improving co-operation;
- Co-operate and consult with the European Judicial Network.
- Assist Europol, particularly by providing opinions based on Europol analyses (as a College);
- Supply logistical support such as assistance for translation, interpretation and the organisation of co-ordination meetings (as a College).
- Ask authorities of Member States to take special investigative measures or other measures justified for investigation or prosecution (through national members);
- Assist investigations and prosecutions concerning the competent authorities of only one Member State, where the European Union itself or a non-Member State are involved (through national members with agreement of the College).

As Eurojust is tasked with facilitating the execution of letters rogatory and extradition requests, it also may act on European Arrest Warrants (EAW). When more than one EAW exists for one individual, Eurojust may advise the judicial authority that executes the EAW which should take priority and may also facilitate communication between the judicial authorities involved. It is also the body to which member states may report delays in execution of EAWs of the reason for such delay. In 2010, a total of 280 cases concerning the execution of EAWs were registered at Eurojust, amounting to almost 20 per cent of all cases.

Eurojust may also take part in a joint investigation team (JIT) or, on request of a member state, help establish one and/or assist in managing one administratively or by securing funding. Such teams are created on the agreement of two or more involved parties for a specific purpose and limited time to carry out criminal investigations in one or more of the member states involved. JITs were established on the belief that cross-state teams of investigators and judicial authorities with clear legal authority and defined roles would improve the fight against organised crime.

=== Caseload ===
Eurojust has handled an increasingly heavy caseload since its creation. In 2002, it was contacted in 202 cases. In 2016, member states sought assistance with 2,306 new cases. The majority cases involve two member states; in 2010, one-fifth of the cases involved three or more countries. Eurojust also organised 249 co-ordination meetings between representatives of national authorities and EU bodies in 2016.

== Administration ==
The College of Eurojust is supported by the administration. As head of the Eurojust administration, the Administrative Director is responsible for the day-to-day management of Eurojust, including budget and staff management. The administrative organisation is composed of units, services and secretariats: the Accounting Office, Budget, Finance and Procurement Unit, College Secretariat, Corporate Communications Office, Data Protection Service, Events and Logistics Office, Human Resources Unit, Information Management Unit, Institutional Affairs Office, Legal Affairs Office, Operations Unit, Planning, Programming & Reporting Office and Security, Facility & General Services.

== International cooperation ==
Eurojust maintains cooperation agreements with 14 non-EU member states. The latest, Armenia, signed a cooperation agreement with Eurojust on 5 April 2024.

== Future developments ==
The Treaty on the Functioning of the European Union (TFEU) addresses several changes to Eurojust. Article 85 extends its scope to including serious crime not only affecting two or more member states, but also requiring prosecution on a common basis. The new wording of the Treaty mentions that by means of regulations adopted in accordance with the ordinary legislative procedure, the European Parliament and the Council shall determine Eurojust's structure, operation, field of action and tasks, which may include initiating criminal investigations or proposing the initiation of prosecutions, coordinating such investigations and prosecutions and strengthening judicial co-operation. Article 86 provides for the possibility of establishing a European Public Prosecutor’s Office (EPPO) from Eurojust in order to combat crimes affecting the financial interests of the Union. The EPPO may be established by the Council, according to a special legislative procedure, acting unanimously and after obtaining the consent of the European Parliament. The Treaty provides also for the possibility to create it by enhanced co-operation established by at least nine Member States.

The Stockholm Programme refers several times to the role of Eurojust. In particular, it states that “in the field of judicial co-operation, the European Council emphasises the need for Member States and Eurojust to implement thoroughly Council Decision 2009/426/JHA of 16 December 2008 on the strengthening of Eurojust, which, together with the Lisbon Treaty, offers an opportunity for the further development of Eurojust in the coming years, including in relation to initiation of investigations and resolving conflicts of competence. On the basis of an assessment of the implementation of this instrument, new possibilities could be considered in accordance with the relevant provisions of the Treaty, including giving further powers to the Eurojust national members, reinforcement of the powers of the College of Eurojust or the setting-up of a European Public Prosecutor”.

== See also ==
- Area of freedom, security and justice
- European Public Prosecutor
- Europol
- Police and Judicial Co-operation in Criminal Matters
- eu-LISA
