= EUCARIS =

European vehicle information exchange

EUCARIS, an acronym for the European Car and Driving Licence Information System, is a collaborative initiative established in 1994 to combat international vehicle crime and driving license tourism through the exchange of vehicle and driving license information among its member nations. The primary aim of EUCARIS is to facilitate seamless information sharing, enabling member countries to conduct checks on potential obstacles for re-registration of vehicles or the exchange of driving licenses. This cooperative effort was formalized through the multilateral EUCARIS Treaty, which governs the activities of participating states in setting up and operating an information exchange system.

EUCARIS currently boasts a membership of 32 European countries, along with territories including Gibraltar, Isle of Man, Jersey, and Guernsey. The system is open for use not only by the treaty-signatory Parties but also by other EU and EFTA countries, categorized as Third Parties. EUCARIS offers the option for additional bilateral agreements, predominantly concerning cross-border enforcement of traffic violations.

The initiative is in the process of developing a Gateway that will enable access to its network for authorities outside the European Union through the internet. This expansion will facilitate cooperation with countries like Australia, the USA, and even low-income nations in Africa, offering them the benefits of information exchange and collaboration facilitated by EUCARIS.

== History ==
In the early 1990s, five European vehicle and driving licence registration authorities (Belgium, Germany, the United Kingdom, Luxembourg, and the Netherlands) took the initiative to set up a network for data communication and to give European countries the opportunity to share vehicle and driver registration information. The EUCARIS Treaty was signed by these states in 2000, and entered into force in 2009.

The system is operational since 1994 and used Tuxedo as main technology for the exchange. In 2007 this system was replaced by the second generation of EUCARIS (a.k.a. EUCARIS II) which uses open standards (XML/Webservice/SOAP). The current EUCARIS software is built using the Microsoft .NET platform.

EUCARIS originated as a response to the challenges posed by international vehicle-related crime and driving license manipulation. It emerged as a collaborative endeavor among national registration authorities of various European countries. The system's goals were threefold:

1. Fight Vehicle-Related Crime: By cross-checking whether vehicles, license plates, or vehicle documents are reported as stolen in any EUCARIS member country, the system aids in preventing the circulation of stolen vehicles and related criminal activities.
2. Efficient Vehicle Registration and Licensing: EUCARIS streamlines the process of registering and licensing vehicles by transferring vehicle data from the country of origin to the country of re-registration. This promotes more efficient and accurate registration procedures.
3. Enhance Data Quality: The system minimizes the need for manual data entry, thus enhancing the accuracy and reliability of national vehicle registrations across member countries. This data quality improvement benefits both national and international administrative processes.

== Supporting treaties or agreements ==
The foundation of EUCARIS lies in the multilateral EUCARIS Treaty, which outlines the regulations governing member states' participation in the information exchange system. This treaty allows the requesting of vehicle information by the member state responsible for re-registering the exported vehicle. Over time, the scope of the EUCARIS system has expanded to cover a broader spectrum of international information exchange within the transport and mobility sector.

Since its inception, EUCARIS has evolved to encompass various applications beyond its initial scope. These include:

- Driving License Information Exchange: EUCARIS facilitates the exchange of driving license information based on the third Directive 2006/126/EC on driving licenses.
- Cross-Border Cooperation: The system plays a crucial role in implementing the Prüm Decisions (EU Council Decision 2008/615/JHA and Council Decision 2008/616/JHA), which enhance cross-border collaboration to combat terrorism and cross-border crime.
- Road Safety Information Exchange: EUCARIS supports Directive 2015/413/EU, enabling the cross-border exchange of information on road-safety-related traffic offenses.
- Administrative Cooperation: It assists in the enforcement of administrative cooperation measures, such as Council Regulation (EU) 2018/1541, aimed at strengthening VAT-related administrative cooperation.
- Enforcement of Toll Payments: EUCARIS enables the exchange of data on vehicle owners/holders to aid the enforcement of toll payments, aligning with the Electronic Toll Service (EETS) Directive.

=== eCall ===
eCall is a project intended to bring rapid assistance to motorists involved in a collision anywhere in the European Union. Member states participating in eCall may use the EUCARIS platform for exchanging messages.

=== RESPER ===
RESPER (Réseau permis de conduire/Drivers License Network) is a network to be established across the European Union which should be fully operational by 19/1/2013. EUCARIS is able to connect to the RESPER network giving the Member States a choice whether they want to use EUCARIS to exchange driving licence information via RESPER.

=== ERRU ===
ERRU (European Register of Road Transport Undertakings) allows competent authorities to better monitor the compliance of road transport undertakings across the European Union. EUCARIS will be able to connect to the ERRU network giving the Member States a choice whether they want to use EUCARIS to exchange information via ERRU.

== Participating member states ==
The table below shows the currently participating member states who are actively exchanging data:

Country	Vehicle information	Driving Licence information	Police information (Prüm)	Owner/Holder information for traffic fines	NorType
Austria			X	X	
Belgium	X	X	X	X	
Croatia	X	X	X	X	
Cyprus	X	X	X	X	
Estonia	X	X	X	X	
Finland	X	X	X	X	X
France	X	X	X	X	
Germany	X	X	X	X	
Gibraltar	X	X		X	
Greece	X	X	X	X	
Hungary	X	X	X	X	
Iceland	X	X			X
Ireland	X	X	X	X	
Jersey	X	X			
Latvia	X	X	X	X	
Lithuania	X	X	X	X	
Luxembourg	X	X	X	X	
Malta	X	X	X	X	
The Netherlands	X	X	X	X	
Norway	X	X			X
Poland		X	X	X	
Portugal			X	X	
Slovakia	X	X	X	X	
Slovenia		X	X	X	
Spain			X	X	
Sweden	X		X	X	X
Switzerland				X	
United Kingdom	X	X			
