= Justice and Home Affairs Council =

Configuration of the Council of the European Union

The Justice and Home Affairs Council (JHA) is one of the configurations of the Council of the European Union and is composed of the justice and home affairs ministers of the 27 European Union member states.

== Composition ==
JHA is composed of the justice and home affairs ministers of the 27 European Union member states. While most member states send one minister for both sectors, others send one minister for justice and another for home affairs.

The European Commissioner for Home Affairs, the European Commissioner for Justice and the European Commissioner for Equality also participate in the meetings.

== Tasks ==
The Justice and Home Affairs Council develops cooperation and common policies on various cross-border issues, with the aim of building an EU-wide area of justice.

Cross-border issues include guaranteeing fundamental rights, free movement of citizens, civil protection, asylum and immigration matters, common investigations into cross-border organised crime, the EU's security strategy, including the fight against terrorism and organised crime, cybercrime and violent radicalisation.

The council covers legislation relating to:

- Free movement of persons, asylum and immigration
- Judicial cooperation in civil matters
- Judicial cooperation in criminal matters
- Police and customs cooperation
- European Union citizenship
- Combating discrimination
- Fight against terrorism
- Fight against organized crime
- Fight against trafficking in human beings
- Combating drugs
- Justice, freedom and security: Enlargement

== Legislative procedure ==
Since the entry into force of the Lisbon Treaty, the Council takes its decisions on most justice and home affairs legislation in co-decision with the European Parliament according to the ordinary legislative procedure.

== See also ==
- Area of freedom, security and justice
- European Parliament Committee on Civil Liberties, Justice and Home Affairs
- European Commission
  - European Commissioner for Justice
  - European Commissioner for Equality
  - European Commissioner for Home Affairs
