= European Union Agency for Law Enforcement Training =

Agency overview
- Formed: 23 December 2000
- Preceding agency: European Police College
- Jurisdiction: European Union
- Headquarters: Budapest, Hungary
- Motto: Educate, Innovate, Motivate
- Agency executive: Jan Pecháček, Executive Director
- Key document: Regulation (EU) 2015/2219
- Website: cepol.europa.eu

Map
- European Union Agency for Law Enforcement Training (European Union)

CEPOL, officially the European Union Agency for Law Enforcement Training, is an agency of the European Union dedicated to training law enforcement officials. The institution was founded in 2000 and adopted its current legal mandate on 1 July 2016. It is based in Budapest, Hungary. Jan Pecháček began a four-year term as executive director in May 2026.

== History ==
CEPOL was established as the European Police College by Council Decision 2000/820/JHA in 2000, which was modified in 2005 by Council Decision 2005/681/JHA. It was originally seated at Bramshill House in Bramshill, Hampshire, England, but was relocated to Budapest, Hungary in 2014 following a European Council decision the previous year.

== Organisation ==
CEPOL contributes to a safer European Union by facilitating cooperation and knowledge sharing among law enforcement officials of the EU member states and to some extent, from third countries, on issues stemming from EU priorities in the field of security; in particular, from the EU Policy Cycle on serious and organised crime. CEPOL brings together a network of training institutes for law enforcement officials in EU member states and supports them in providing frontline training on security priorities, law enforcement cooperation and information exchange. CEPOL also works with EU bodies, international organisations, and third countries to ensure that the most serious security threats are tackled with a collective response. CEPOL is headed by an Executive Director, who is accountable to a Management Board. The Management Board is made up of representatives from EU member states and the EU Commission. The chair of the Management Board is a representative of one of the three member states that have jointly prepared the Council of the European Union's 18-month programme. The Management Board meets at least two times per year. In addition, CEPOL has dedicated National Units (CNUs) in every member state to provide information and assistance to law enforcement officials who wish to participate in CEPOL's activities. CNUs also support CEPOL's operations. The agency's annual work programme is built with input from this network and other stakeholders, resulting in topical and focused activities designed to meet the needs of member states in the priority areas of the EU internal security strategy. Moreover, CEPOL assesses training needs to address EU security priorities. CEPOL's current portfolio encompasses residential activities, online learning (i.e. webinars, online modules, online courses, etc.), exchange programmes, common curricula, research and science.

=== Cooperation beyond the EU ===
CEPOL cooperates with various law enforcement agencies and governments beyond the EU. For instance, on 2 February 2024 CEPOL Executive Director Montserrat Marín López met with Aram Hovhannisyan, the Deputy Minister of Internal Affairs and Police Chief Major General of Armenia. The sides discussed enhancing cooperation and dialogue, among other issues of mutual interest.

CEPOL cooperates with countries in the European Neighbourhood Policy, including countries of the EU's Eastern Partnership and countries in the Western Balkans and North Africa. CEPOL assists the authorities of these countries to tackle organized crime, terrorism, and encourages information exchange.

== See also ==
- Europol
- Police training
