= European Commissioner for Internal Affairs and Migration =

Member of the EU Commission

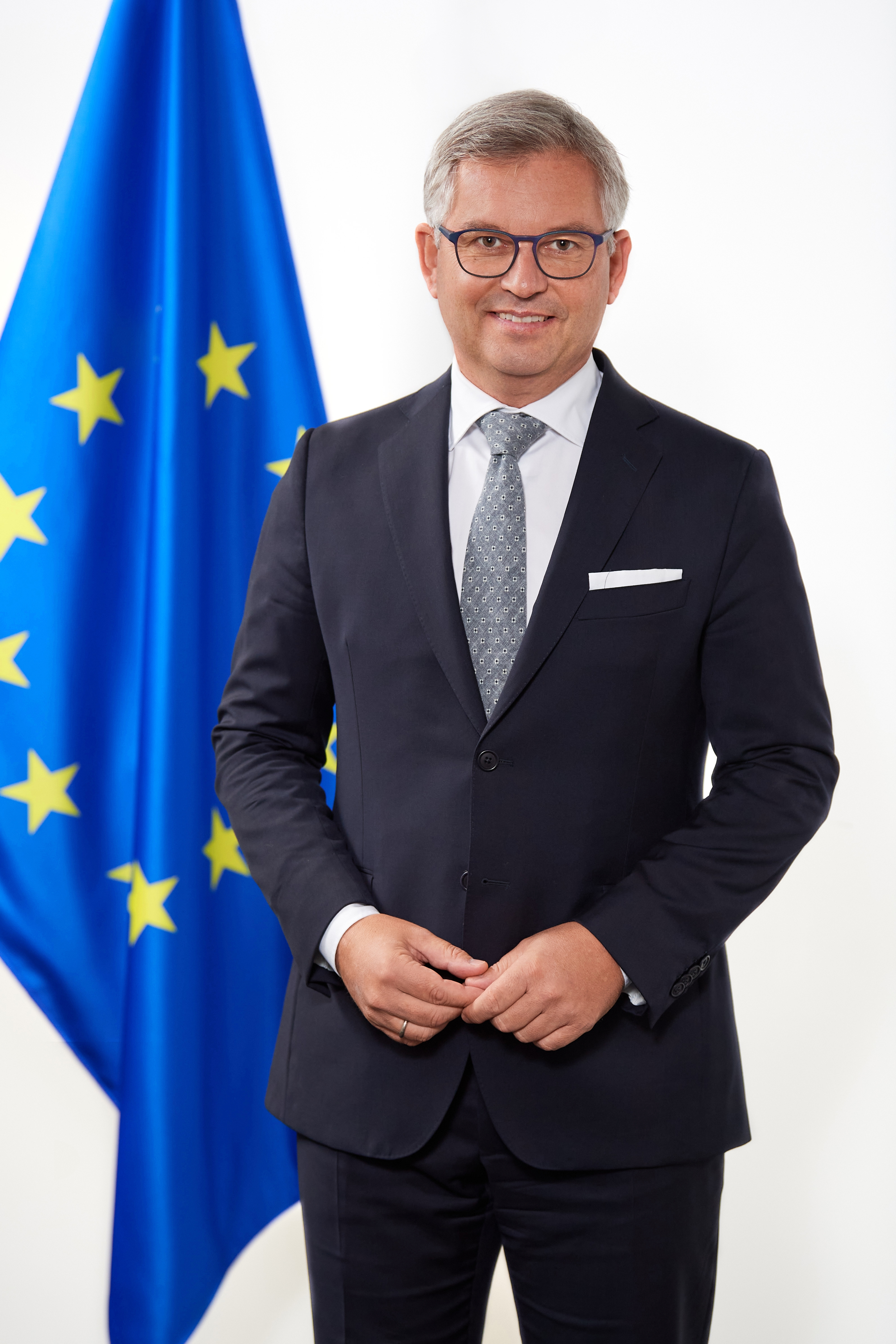
- Incumbent; Magnus Brunner since 1 December 2024
- Appointer: President of the European Commission
- Term length: 5 years
- Website: https://commission.europa.eu/about/organisation/college-commissioners/magnus-brunner_en

The European Commissioner for Internal Affairs and Migration is a member of the European Commission. Its responsibilities include internal security, counter-terrorism, law enforcement, migration policy, border control, and maintaining the Schengen Area’s integrity.

The position was created in 2010 by dividing the previous Justice, Freedom and Security portfolio. The portfolio was divided into two posts, a security orientated post (DG HOME), and a post centered on justice, individual and fundamental rights (DG JUST). Its DG is the Directorate-General for Migration and Home Affairs (DG HOME).

== Commissioners in charge of Home Affairs ==
Name	Country	Period	Commission	Portfolio actual name
Anita Gradin	Sweden	1995–1999	Santer Commission	Immigration, Justice & Home Affairs, Financial Control, Anti-fraud and Relations with the European Ombudsman.
António Vitorino	Portugal	1999–2004	Prodi Commission	Justice and Home Affairs
Franco Frattini	Italy	2004–2008	Barroso Commission I	Justice, Freedom and Security (vice-president)
Jacques Barrot	France	2008–2009	Barroso Commission I	Justice, Freedom and Security (vice-president)
Cecilia Malmström	Sweden	2010–2014	Barroso Commission II	Home Affairs
Viviane Reding	Luxembourg	2010–2014	Barroso Commission II	Justice, Fundamental Rights and Citizenship (vice-president)
Martine Reicherts	Luxembourg	2014	Barroso Commission II	Justice, Fundamental Rights and Citizenship
Dimitris Avramopoulos	Greece	2014–2019	Juncker Commission	Migration, Home Affairs and Citizenship
Ylva Johansson	Sweden	2019–2024	Von der Leyen Commission I	Home Affairs
Magnus Brunner	Austria	2024–present	Von der Leyen Commission II	Internal Affairs and Migration
