= Herbert Trimbach =

German lawyer (born 1954)

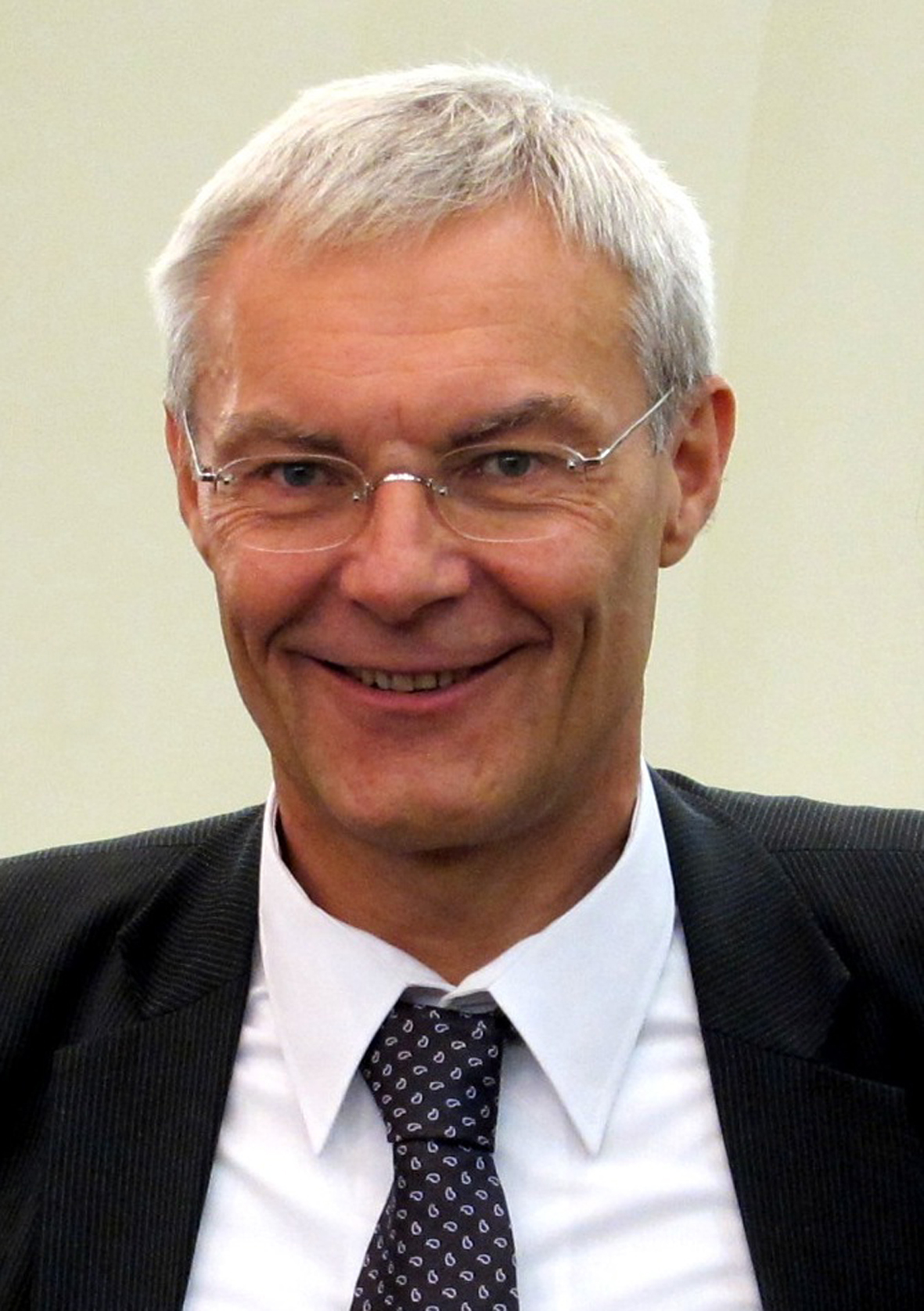
Herbert Trimbach

Herbert Josef Trimbach (born 18 August 1954 in Schwärzelbach/Lower Franconia) is a German lawyer who since 1 February 2012 has been head of department "Public Order and Security, Police and Regulatory Law, Fire and Civil Protection, Rescue Services" within the Ministry of the Interior and Municipal Affairs of the federal state of Brandenburg. Trimbach is a member of Task Force II "Internal Security" and since 1 July 2015 has been chairman of Task Force V "Fire and Rescue Service Affairs, Civil Protection and Civil Defence" of the Interior Ministers' Conference (IMC). In this body the federal states and the federation agree among other things on the topics such as civil protection, consequences of the reform of the Bundeswehr, the tasks of the civil defence and protection as well as the impact of the demographic change and the resulting implications for the sectors fire and rescue service, civil defence and volunteering. In addition, defence of critical infrastructures and further development of civil protection in the light of the climate change also play a crucial role.

== Biography ==
Upon graduation from the Frobenius-Gymnasium in Hammelburg, Trimbach did his basic military service from 1974 to 1975. From 1975 to 1980, he studied law and history in Würzburg and Speyer. He completed his studies in 1983 passing his Second State Law Examination in Munich.

Subsequently, Trimbach worked in the Free State of Bavaria as a prosecutor and judge as well as at the Federal Ministry of Justice in Bonn. While he as head of division at the Ministry had a focus on public law, his activity as judge at the district court in Schweinfurt was concentrated on civil and trade law as well as criminal law. 1988 he attained a doctorate of both laws (Dr. iur. utr.) at the Julius Maximilian University of Würzburg under the supervision of Franz-Ludwig Knemeyer.

From 1984 to 1992, Trimbach was a town council member in Hammelburg and a district assembly member in the district of Bad Kissingen. In August 1992, he moved to join the federal state of Brandenburg. After his activity as judge at the district court of Potsdam, he worked until 2007 at the Ministry of Justice and European Affairs, headed by Hans-Otto Bräutigam. There he was head of division for civil law, civil procedure law and cadastre law, and since 1997 deputy head of department for public law, private law and law policy. Dirk Brouër who later became the Bundesrat Director was head of department. During that time Trimbach concentrated on legal regulations on pending property issues. Since 2002, Trimbach had a secondary occupation as chairman of the staff council at the State Ministry of Justice and since 2005 as a member of the federal state personnel commission.

From 2007 to 2012, Trimbach was presiding judge at the Higher Regional Court of Brandenburg where he presided over the 13th Civil Senate and the 4th Family Senate.

Since 1 February 2012, he as undersecretary has been head of department "Public Order and Security, Police and Regulatory Law, Fire and Civil Protection, Rescue Services" within the Ministry of the Interior and Municipal Affairs of the federal state of Brandenburg where he succeeded Jürgen Storbeck.

Trimbach is also a junior lawyer training supervisor and has a secondary occupation as an examiner at the 1st and 2nd State Law Examination and the author of scientific publications on legal and legal political topics (e.g. in the Neue Juristische Wochenschrift (German: New Legal Weekly Journal), the Neue Justiz (NJ) (German: New Justice Newspaper). He is a co-editor of the "pvt – Polizei Verkehr + Technik" professional magazine (German: pvt – Police, Transport + Technology). Trimbach is a member of the Social Democratic Party of Germany and the Police Trade Union (GdP). Furthermore, he was a founding member and vice president of the German-Ukrainian Lawyers' Association.

Since 1975, he has been a member of the Europa-Union of Hammelburg. Within the framework of his lectures and seminars, also abroad in Europe, he champions the idea of the united Europe. In 2015 he was awarded an honorary certificate from the district of Bad Kissingen for his commitment during his 40-year-long membership.

== Works ==
- Dirk Brouër, Herbert Trimbach et al.: Pending Property Issues, a guidebook. Rowohlt 1995, ISBN 3-499-13672-4
