= Catherine De Bolle =

Belgian law enforcement official

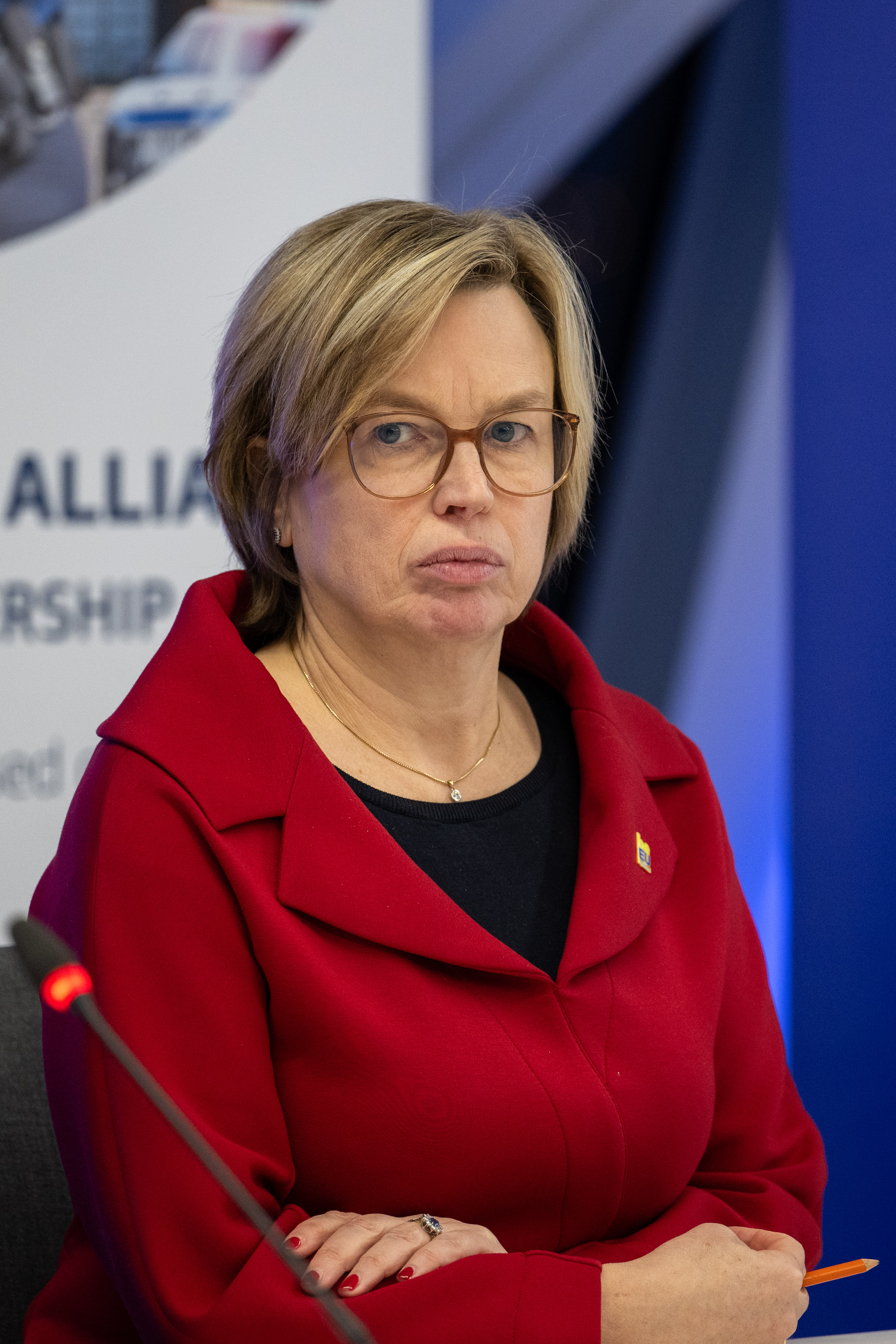
- De Bolle in 2024

Executive Director of Europol
- In office May 1, 2018 – May 1, 2026
- Deputy: Wil Van Gemert; Jean-Philippe Lecouffe
- Preceded by: Rob Wainwright
- Succeeded by: Jurgen Ebner (Acting)

Chief Commissioner of the Belgian Federal Police
- In office March 1, 2012 – May 1, 2018
- Preceded by: Paul Van Thielen
- Succeeded by: Marc De Mesmaeker

Personal details
- Born: 17 February 1970 (age 56) Aalst, Belgium
- Education: University of Ghent (JD)
- Awards: Commander, Order of the Belgian Cross

Catherine De Bolle (born 17 February 1970) was the executive director of Europol between 2018 and 2026. She succeeded Rob Wainwright, whose term expired on 1 May 2018. Before that she was the chief commissioner of the Belgian federal police (1 March 2012–1 May 2018) and chief of the police of zone Ninove (2001–2012).

== Biography ==
De Bolle studied law at the Ghent University between 1988 and 1993 and went on to receive an officer training at the Rijkswacht from 1994 till 1997. In 1994 and 2001 she was active as a lawyer with the Federal police, and in 2001 she was nominated chief of staff in Ninove.

She attained the degree of lieutenant on March 28, 1997 and became chief commissioner on January 1, 2005.

== Commissioner-general of the Federal Police ==
After commissioner-general Fernand Koekelberg decommissioned in March 2011 and Paul Van Thielen became commissioner-general ad interim, De Bolle postulated as candidate. The selection committee of the general inspection deemed her to be the most adequate candidate for the position. After confirmation of this choice by the Federal Police Board, her assignment as very first female commissioner general was confirmed by the council of ministers and she was appointed by the King. De Bolle took the oath of office on February 29 and on March 1, 2012 she started in the function.

In 2015 De Bolle became the European representative of the executing committee of Interpol, a mandate of 3 years.

In 2018 she was succeeded as commissioner-general by Marc De Mesmaeker.

== Executive Director of Europol ==
On 1 May 2018, De Bolle was appointed as the Executive Director of Europol. Her tenure saw the agency grow its technological capabilities to combat online crime, including crackdowns on encrypted communications networks like Sky ECC and EncroChat that were used to facilitate drug trafficking, money laundering, and other organized criminal activities. This increased focus on online investigations also drew new scrutiny from data privacy advocates. In 2022, the European Data Protection Supervisor (EDPS) ordered Europol to erase large datasets that the agency had collected from individuals with "no established link to a criminal activity". The EDPS continued to clash with Europol into 2025, with the independent investigative authority stating that complaints of alleged data-violations rose by 25% between 2024 and 2025.

Migrant and data privacy advocates have also raised concerns about Europol's cooperation with Frontex during De Bolle's tenure. Frontex and Europol have been accused of unlawfully sharing data on people questioned at European borders. Europol and Frontex claim that their urgent operational needs to combat smuggling and illegal immigration outweigh data privacy concerns. Between 2022 and 2023, the European Commission introduced legislation to give Europol more leeway in the collection of data.

In 2024, a leaked internal agency memo revealed that the paper personal files of several top staffers, including De Bolle, were missing from a highly secure storage room inside Europol's headquarters in The Hague. Europol's head of Human Resources, Massimiliano Bettin, was dismissed, but no further details of the disappearance were released.

On 1 May 2026, De Bolle left her post as Executive Director of Europol. Her "right-hand man", Jurgen Ebner, immediately took over as Acting Executive Director.

== Other activities ==
- International Gender Champions (IGC), Member

== Distinction ==
- Commander, Order of the Belgian Cross
- Commander of the Order of Leopold
