= Max-Peter Ratzel =

German law enforcement officer (born 1949)

Executive Director of Europol
- In office April 16, 2005 – April 16, 2009
- Preceded by: Jürgen Storbeck
- Succeeded by: Rob Wainwright

Personal details
- Born: 1949 (age 76–77) Dillingen/Saar, Germany
- Education: University of Saarbrücken
- Profession: Law Enforcement Officer
- Website: Ratzel Consulting Firm

Max-Peter Ratzel (born in 1949 in Dillingen/Saar, Germany) is a German law enforcement officer, and a former director of Europol, the European Union law enforcement agency that handles criminal intelligence.

== Education ==
Director Ratzel studied mathematics and physics in the University of Saarbrücken and served in the German Air Force.

== Career ==
The career of Director Ratzel started in the Bundeskriminalamt (Federal Criminal Police Office, Wiesbaden, Germany) in 1976, as the Head of the Organised and General Crime Department. His unit which was specialised in combating child pornography, Internet crime, counterfeit money and human trafficking, had over 850 police officers under his supervision.

== Europol ==
On February 24, 2005, the Justice and Home Affairs Council selected Director Ratzel as the successor of Director Storbeck as the General Director of Europol. He took up his position on April 16, 2005.

In April 2009, he was succeeded by Director Wainwright.

After retiring as a civil servant Ratzel founded a security company.

== See also ==
- B.K.A.
- Europol
