= Marc De Mesmaeker =

Belgian General Commissioner of the Federal Police

General Commissioner of the Federal Police
- Incumbent
- Assumed office 15 June 2018
- Preceded by: Catherine De Bolle

Director-General of the Administrative and Technical Secretariat (ATS) for Home Affairs
- In office December 2011 – 2018

Director of the Legal Service of the Federal Police
- In office 2001–2008

Security Advisor to the Minister of the Interior
- In office 2008–2011

Personal details
- Born: 13 May 1961 (age 65) Uccle, Belgium
- Education: Master's degree in criminology (University of Ghent), Master's degree in law (Free University of Brussels)
- Occupation: Police Officer, Senior Public Servant

Marc De Mesmaeker (born 13 May 1961) is a senior Belgian police officer. Since 15 June 2018 he has been General Commissioner of the Federal Police, becoming the fifth person to hold the post and the first to take it after a selection procedure run by an independent committee. There were seven candidates. His predecessor Catherine De Bolle moved on to become executive director of Europol. He was previously director-general of the Administrative and Technical Secretariat (ATS) for Home Affairs.

Born in Uccle, in the 1980s he studied at the Royal Military School and then at the Royal Gendarmerie School (École Royale de Gendarmerie (fr) Koninklijke Rijkswachtschool (nl)). In 1983 he completed a master's degree in criminology at the University of Ghent. He then graduated as a master of law at the Free University of Brussels. In 1991 he graduated with the highest distinction from the VUB, receiving the René Marcq Prize.

He began his police career as a 'pelotonscommandant Infanterie' in the Belgian Gendarmerie's flying squad in Wilrijk. After a period in the Royal Gendarmerie School, in 1991 he became responsible for the Subject Matter Disputes Unit.
