= Cross Channel Intelligence Community =

Community Collaboration

The Cross Channel Intelligence Community logo

The Cross Channel Intelligence Community (CCIC), is a regional alliance between law enforcement agencies operating in the English Channel Coast/North Sea geographic area.

The CCIC consists of representatives from the United Kingdom, France, Belgium and the Netherlands, and operates on a regional basis to deal with lower level criminality. It runs in tandem to the work of Europol, the European Union's Criminal Intelligence Agency, which has an international rather than regional focus.

== History ==
CCIC was established in 1968 to aid cross-border police co-operation, and to support police forces in the area to tackle the activities of the criminal minority who exploit the freedom of movement across EU frontiers to engage in criminal activity and conceal their proceeds of crime.

In 1985 there were approximately 14,000 passengers travelling through the Port of Dover. In 2007 passenger numbers reached a record high of just over 14 million, thereby increasing the importance of the role of the CCIC.

== Membership ==
=== United Kingdom ===
- Home Office
- Serious Organised Crime Agency
- Essex Police
- Kent Police

=== France ===
- National Gendarmerie
- National Police

=== Belgium ===
- Federal Police

=== Netherlands ===
- Rotterdam-Rijnmond regional police

== Structure ==
An annual conference enables representatives of member forces to share information, best practice and decide on the community's strategic objectives for the coming year. An Executive Board of eight senior police officers from the four member countries meets quarterly. Six working groups regularly report to the board.

The current chair is Frank Goegebuer from the Belgian Federal Police - his chairmanship will run until mid-2012.

== Functions ==
By sharing intelligence and providing key contacts, the CCIC can actively support operational activity in relation to people trafficking, counter-terrorism supply of illegal drugs, illegal immigration and cross-border criminality as it relates to passenger and freight transport.

Strategic objectives for 2011 include:

- promoting trans-frontier co-operation
- contributing to reducing crime and criminality across borders
- protecting the public from harm by sharing best practice
- increasing communication across member forces

== 2012 Olympic Games ==
The CCIC has a central role to play in the co-ordination of member law enforcement agencies in relation to security for the 2012 Summer Olympics particularly as national teams will travel to London to compete from the European mainland and ports in Kent (namely the Channel ports and the Channel Tunnel itself) are expected to reach their capacity of 110,000 people daily. The CCIC has set up an Olympic Games sub-group that is working with the French, Belgians and Dutch to make sure that there is coordinated approach to policing during the course of the Games.
