= Storbeck =

Storbeck is a surname. Notable people with the surname include:

- Chad Michael Storbeck (born 1971), American drag queen also known as Chad Michaels
- Fred Storbeck (1889–1970), South African Boer blacksmith and heavyweight boxer
- Jürgen Storbeck (born 1946), German law enforcement officer

== See also ==
- Starbeck
