= Rob Wainwright (civil servant) =

Welsh civil servant

Sir Rob Wainwright KCMG
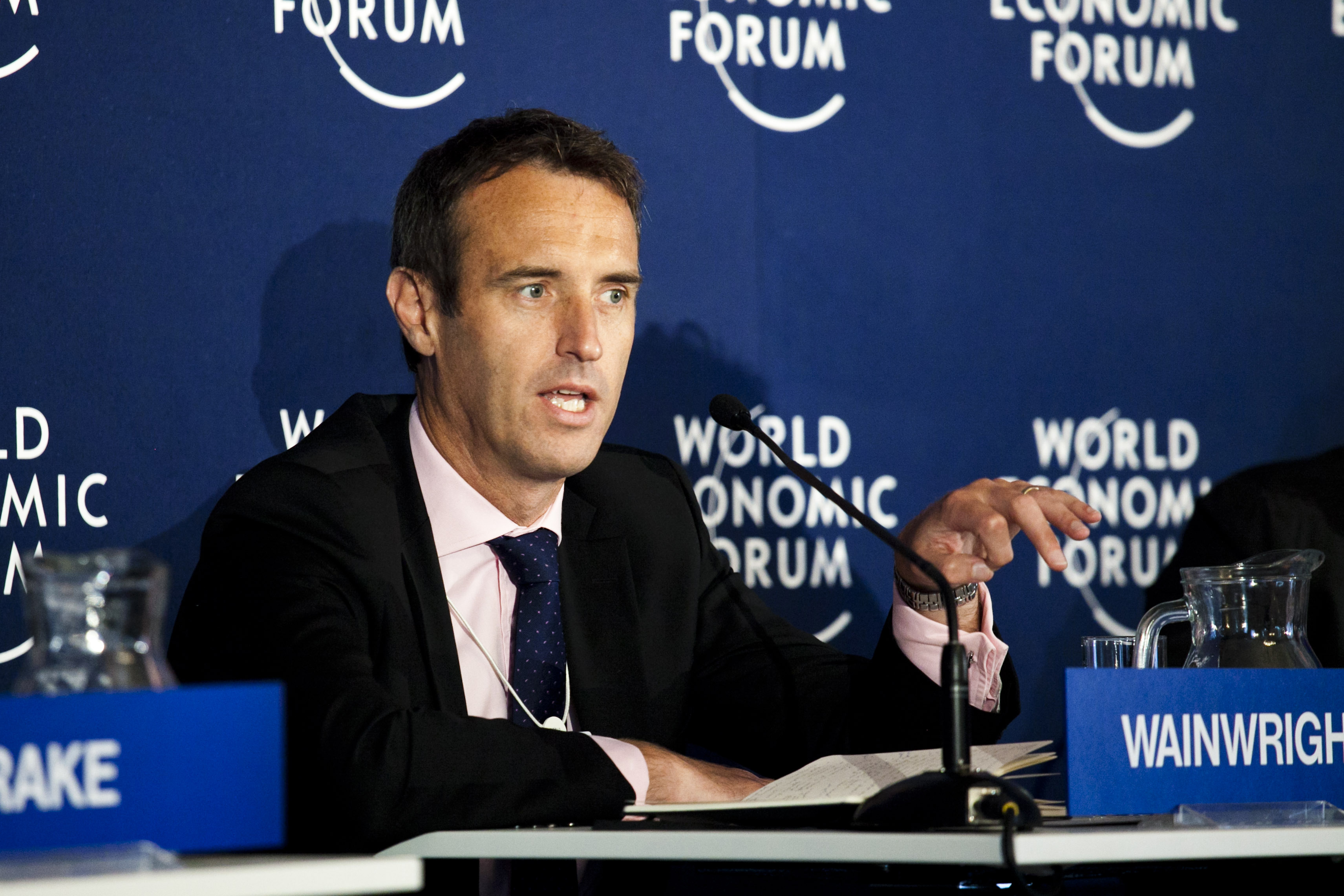
- Wainwright in January 2012

Executive Director of Europol
- In office 16 April 2009 – 1 May 2018
- Preceded by: Max-Peter Ratzel
- Succeeded by: Catherine De Bolle

Personal details
- Born: 17 September 1967 (age 59) Carmarthen, Wales
- Education: London School of Economics (BSc)
- Profession: Law Enforcement
- Website: www.europol.europa.eu

Sir Robert Mark Wainwright KCMG (born 17 September 1967) is a British civil servant. He was the director of Europol from 16 April 2009 until 1 May 2018. Wainwright began his career as an intelligence analyst with MI5. He later became a liaison officer to Europol, head of the British national Europol unit and the UK board Europol member. He was appointed Director of International Affairs of the UK's National Criminal Intelligence Service (NCIS) in 2003 and head of the international department of the UK's Serious Organised Crime Agency (SOCA) in 2006. In April 2009, he became the Director of Europol serving until May 2018 when he was succeeded by Catherine De Bolle. In 2018, Wainwright was knighted for his services to policing and security.

== Early life and education ==
He was raised in Pontyberem, Wales and attended Gwendraeth Grammar School. Wainwright attended the London School of Economics where he graduated with a BSc in 1989.

== Career ==
Wainwright first worked for the United Kingdom's Security Service (MI5) as an intelligence analyst.

From 2000 to 2003, he was the UK Management Board member at Europol and a UK Liaison Officer. At the same time, he was Head of the British Europol National Unit in London.

In 2003, he was appointed Director of International Affairs of the UK's National Criminal Intelligence Service (NCIS), where he was responsible for international operations and for the development and implementation of a British strategy against illegal immigration. From 2006, Wainwright held the post of head of the international department of the UK's Serious Organised Crime Agency (SOCA).

In April 2009, Wainwright was appointed Director of Europol, the European police office, being the first director who did not have a police background or come from a national police force. At Europol, he led a staff of over 800 personnel supporting law enforcement authorities in the 27 EU Member States, in particular to tackle international organised crime. Europol's became a formal EU agency on 1 January 2010, acquiring a stronger mandate and new capabilities.

On 1 July 2011, Wainwright hosted HM Queen Beatrix of the Netherlands as she officially opened Europol's new headquarters in The Hague. In March 2012, the Council of Justice and Home Affairs extended Wainwright's term of office as director until 2017. It was subsequently extended until 1 May 2018, after which he was succeeded by Catherine De Bolle.

In 2018, Wainwright was knighted for his services to policing and security. The same year, he was tapped to run Deloitte's European cyber practice.

He has said society accepts that intercepting private phone calls is "a reasonable way to run a democracy".
