= 101 Air Unit =

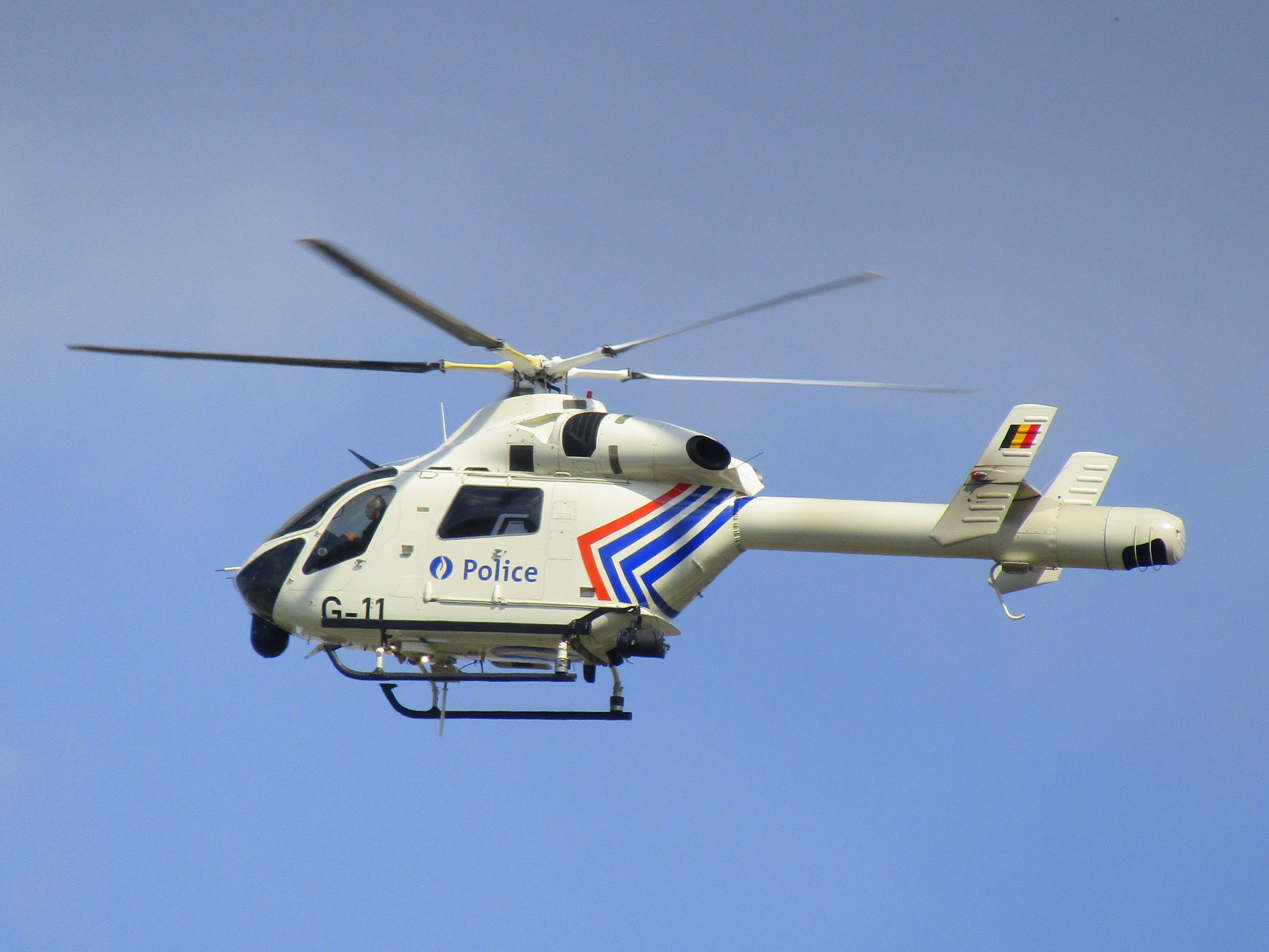
An MD-900 Explorer in 2016. One of six helicopters used by the Air Support Service of Belgium.

101 Air Unit (French: 101 Unité Aérienne) is a Belgian documentary mini-series, in six episodes of 52 minutes each, directed by Didier Verbeek in 2011, and broadcast from April 5, 2011, on channel La Une.

The series followed the actions of the Air Support Service (DAFA) of the federal police if Belgium, from their takeoff from the Melsbroek base to the different types of missions carried out. Most crews are Dutch-speaking.

== Statistics ==
The 3rd episode is estimated to having been watched by 272,827 viewers on La Une alone. The following episode was watched by 175,136 viewers.
