= Project Habitance =

Operation by the National Crime Agency of the United Kingdom

- Operation name: Project Habitance
- Type: Child Pornography sting operations

Participants
- Executed by: United Kingdom National Crime Agency, Germany, Brazil, United States
- No. of countries participating: 4

Mission
- Target: Dark web child pornography websites

Timeline
- Date begin: Before 2018
- Date end: after 2021

Project Habitance aka Operation Habitance was the United Kingdom's (UK) National Crime Agency's (NCA) project tackling child sexual exploitation offending on the dark web. The project and its operations are not fully declassified, but there are documents that show it was running at least from 2018 to 2021.

The NCA through its operation said in 2020 that it was monitoring some 70 dark web sites that were accessible, and by working with partners, the NCA had identified a significant number of unique global IP addresses visiting the dark web sites. With 5 percent of the IP addresses originating from users in the UK.

In 2019 the NCA, working in partnership with the U.S. Federal Bureau of Investigation under (FBI) Project Jarvis, availed their resources via Operation Habitance to the Brazilian Federal Police as part of their Operation Lobos 1, and to the German Bundeskriminalamt (BKA) in a Tor deanonymization project as a dragnet of the administrators and users of the websites: Baby-Heart, Hurt-meh, Boyvids 4.0, Anjos Prohibidos (BR)/Forbidden-Angels, and Loli Lust, Girland and other websites. During the time the Tor Onion services were active, starting in early March 2019, the NCA and their partners conducted traffic analysis under the Targeted Equipment Interference (TEI) warrants 91-TEI-0147-2019 and 91-TEI-0146-2019.

Redacted National Crime Agency (NCA) Intelligence report to the U.S. Federal Bureau of Investigation (FBI) about a user of dark website Hurt-meh

FOIPA response from FBI about 7,268 pages of responsive records to FOIPA request number 1590339-000

== Methodology ==
"According to the Research by the German ARD political magazine Panorama STRG_F (NDR/funk), reported that law enforcement agencies infiltrated the Tor network in order to expose criminals. The reporters had access to documents showing four successful deanonymizations." The process involved a process that translates from German as "IP Catching." The method utilizes timing analyses also called timing attacks or Traffic analysis and were at least performed in 2019 Q3 and 2021 Q2. The name of the United States software used to accomplish this deanonyization is thought to be "Good Listener" as part of "Operation Woodpecker Ridge". As the names of these tools and a manual were mentioned in emails that were obtained via FOIA request about the Project. There are claims that this method of identifying TOR IP user addresses is illegal.

== Results ==
The NCA says that through its programs, it had been making on average 520 arrests each month as of 2020, and that it had "safeguarded" 700 children each month.

== Legality ==
The legality of this will undoubtedly continue to be litigated for a number of years as it's a novel technology with unknown implications for privacy, accuracy or precision. Different countries constitutions may or may not forbid this, and common law will have to suss this out in the courts. "Benjamin Lück of the Society for Civil Rights, a non-profit organization dedicated to strengthening fundamental rights, describes the process as "a profound infringement on the rights of innocent parties" that must be explicitly regulated by lawmakers. He argues that "IP catching" is approaching "light data retention."

== Secrecy ==
In 2020, the U.K. HMICFRS's confirmed the existence of Operation Habitance in a report, but the next year, a U.K FOIA commissioner in Wales affirmed the Gwent Police department's refusal under FOIA section 25(3) (see report)

FOIA Commissioner Decision Regarding Project Habitance and Inhabitance - IC-89921-T6T3

to even confirm the existence of the operation or their involvement. The U.S. FBI FOIA has not been much better, as of 2022 the U.S. has acknowledged receipt of information from the NCA regarding allegations generated by Project Habitance, but has redacted all relevant information on the few records they have released. Journalists first reached out to Ricochet in July 2023 about the cases of deanonymization of Tor Users, with fears of Authoritarian regimes being able to deanonymize them.

== Participating law enforcement agencies ==
- Brazil - Operation Lobos 1
- Germany
  - Federal Criminal Police Office (Germany) Bundeskriminalamt (BKA)
- United States- Operation Liberty Lane, Project Jarvis (child pornography's operation), Project Woodpecker Ridge, Operation Goodlistener
  - Homeland Security Investigations (HSI)
  - Federal Bureau of Investigation (FBI)
- United Kingdom – National Crime Agency (NCA)
