= No More Ransom =

Project against ransomware

- Commercial?: No
- Established: July 26, 2016
- Website: www.nomoreransom.org

No More Ransom is a project focused on reducing the impact of ransomware attacks by providing freely available software that can decrypt files of various ransomware implementations. The project is supported by the Dutch National Police Corps and Europol.

== History ==
The project was founded on 26 July 2016. As of 2022, the project is affiliated with 188 partners.
