= Federal Police (Belgium) =

Federal Police Federale Politie (Dutch) Police Fédérale (French) Föderale Polizei (German)
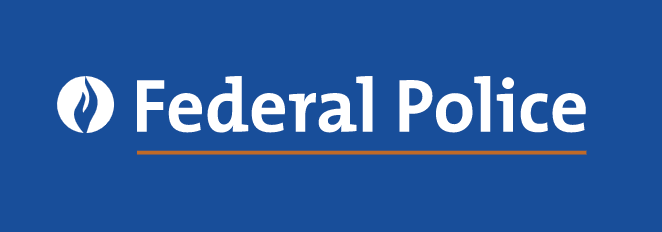
- English-language logo of the Belgian Federal Police

Agency overview
- Formed: 2001
- Preceding agencies: Municipal police forces; Belgian Gendarmerie; Judicial police forces
- Employees: 12,262 (9,065 operatives and 3,197 civilian personnel)

Jurisdictional structure
- Federal agency (Operations jurisdiction): Belgium
- Operations jurisdiction: Belgium
- Legal jurisdiction: As per operations jurisdiction
- General nature: Federal law enforcement; Civilian police

Operational structure
- Agency executive: Marc De Mesmaeker, General Commissioner

Website
- www.polfed-fedpol.be
- Reference for above data.

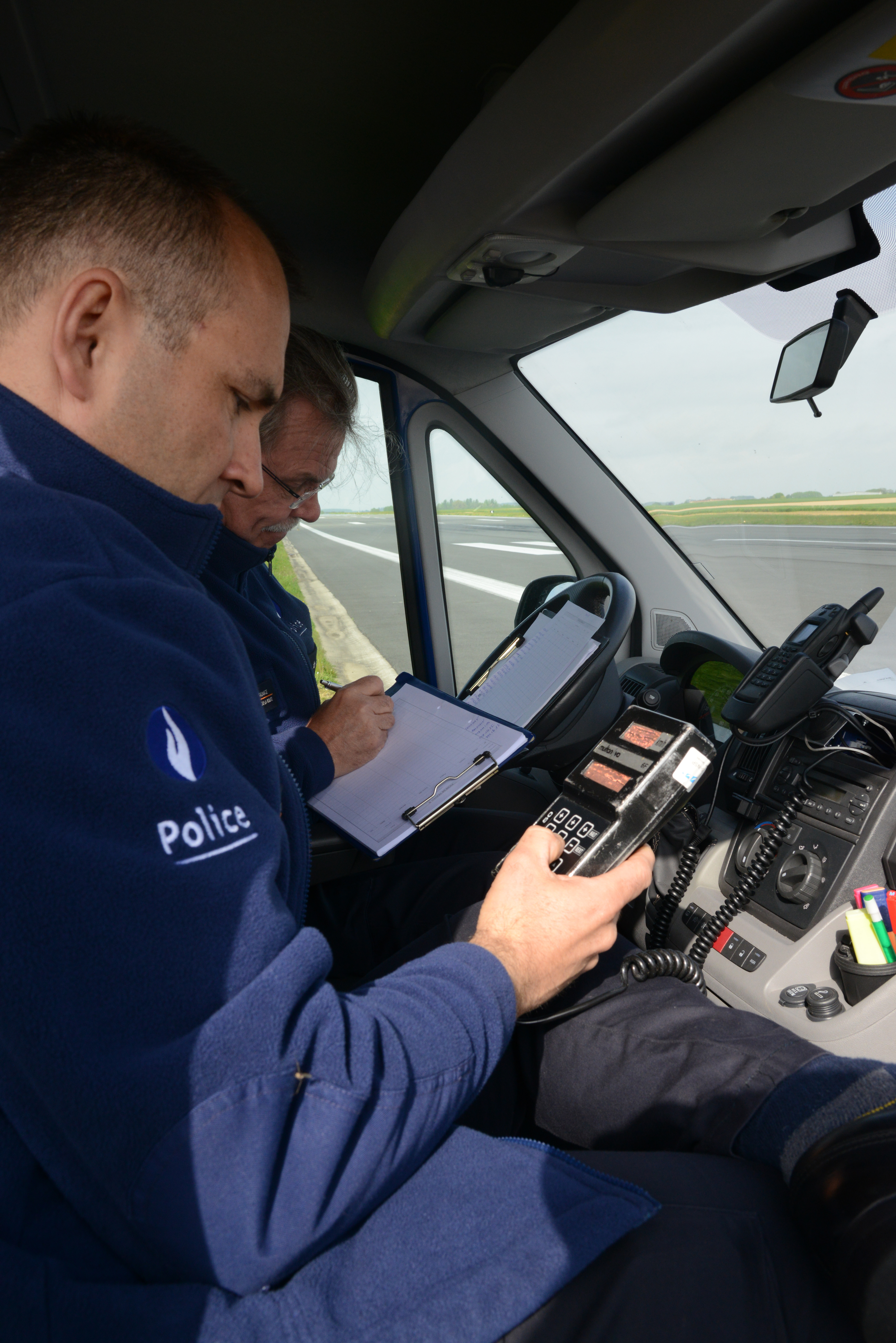
Belgian Federal Police officers of the Roads and Highways Unit (Wegpolitie - Police de la Route (WPR)). Federal agents are recognisable by the orange lines next to their name badges, unlike local police officers who display light-blue lines

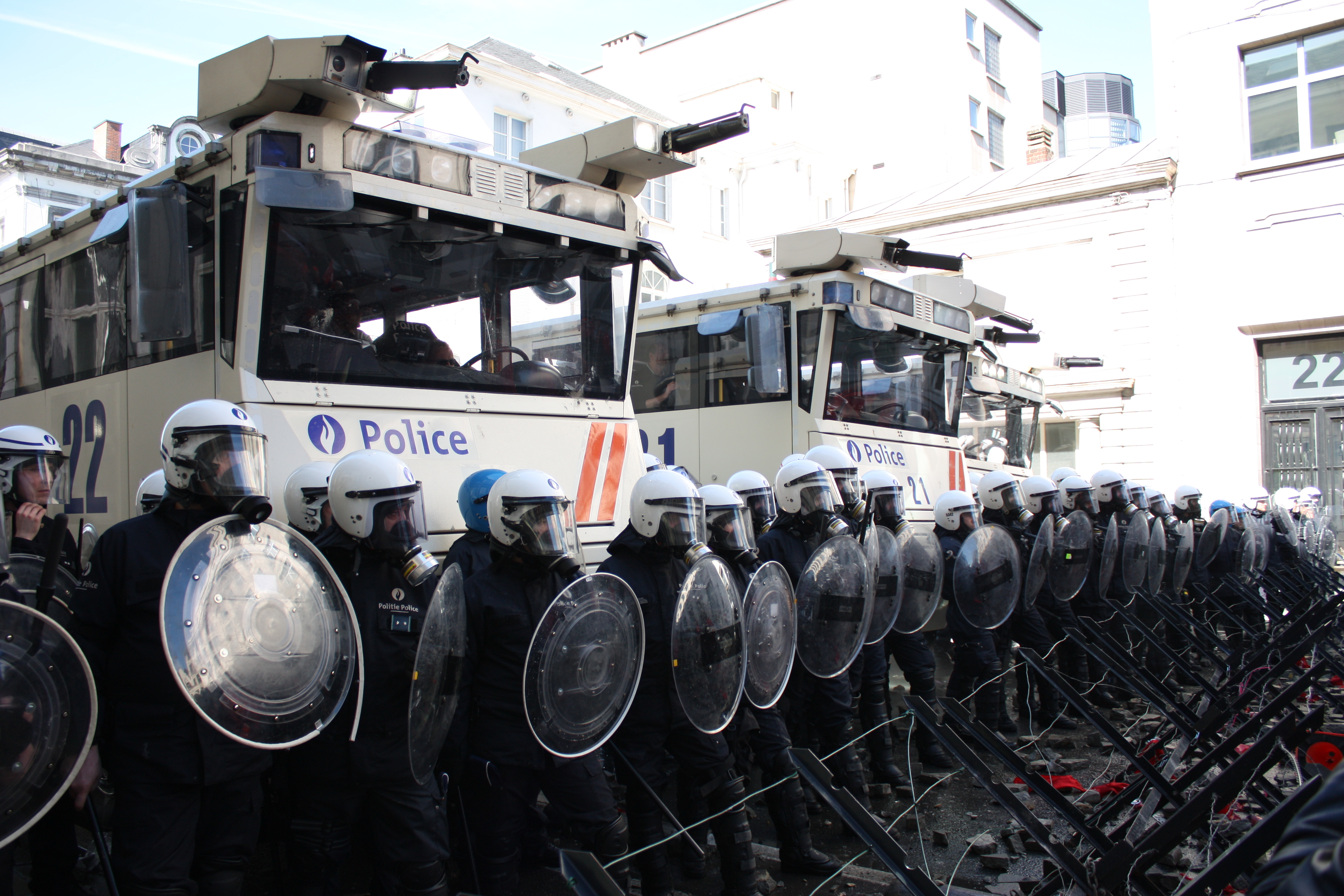
Agents of the riot units from the Federal police

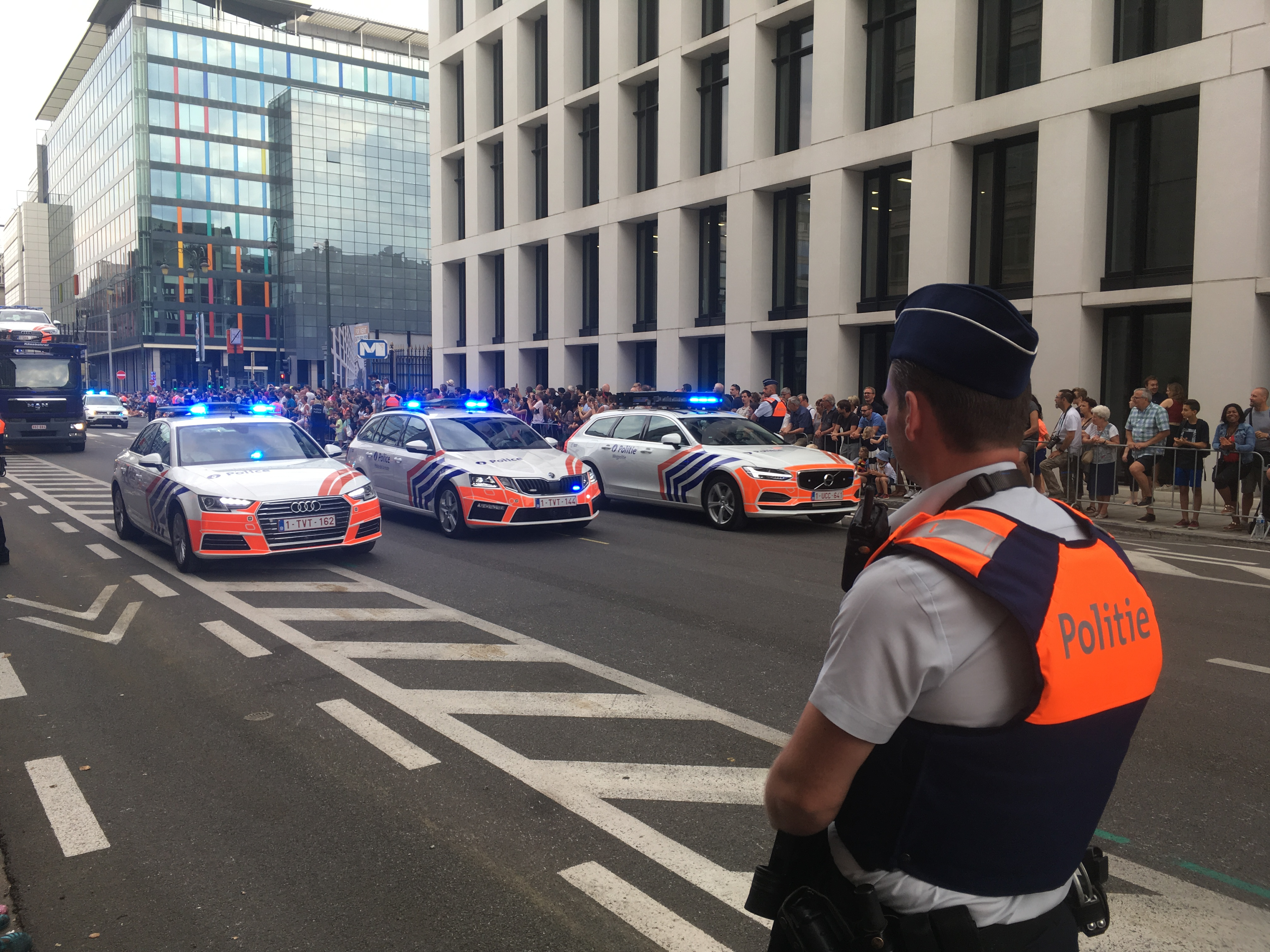
Federal Police vehicles (recognisable by the two orange lines on the bonnet and a single orange line on the sides) of the Road and Highways unit

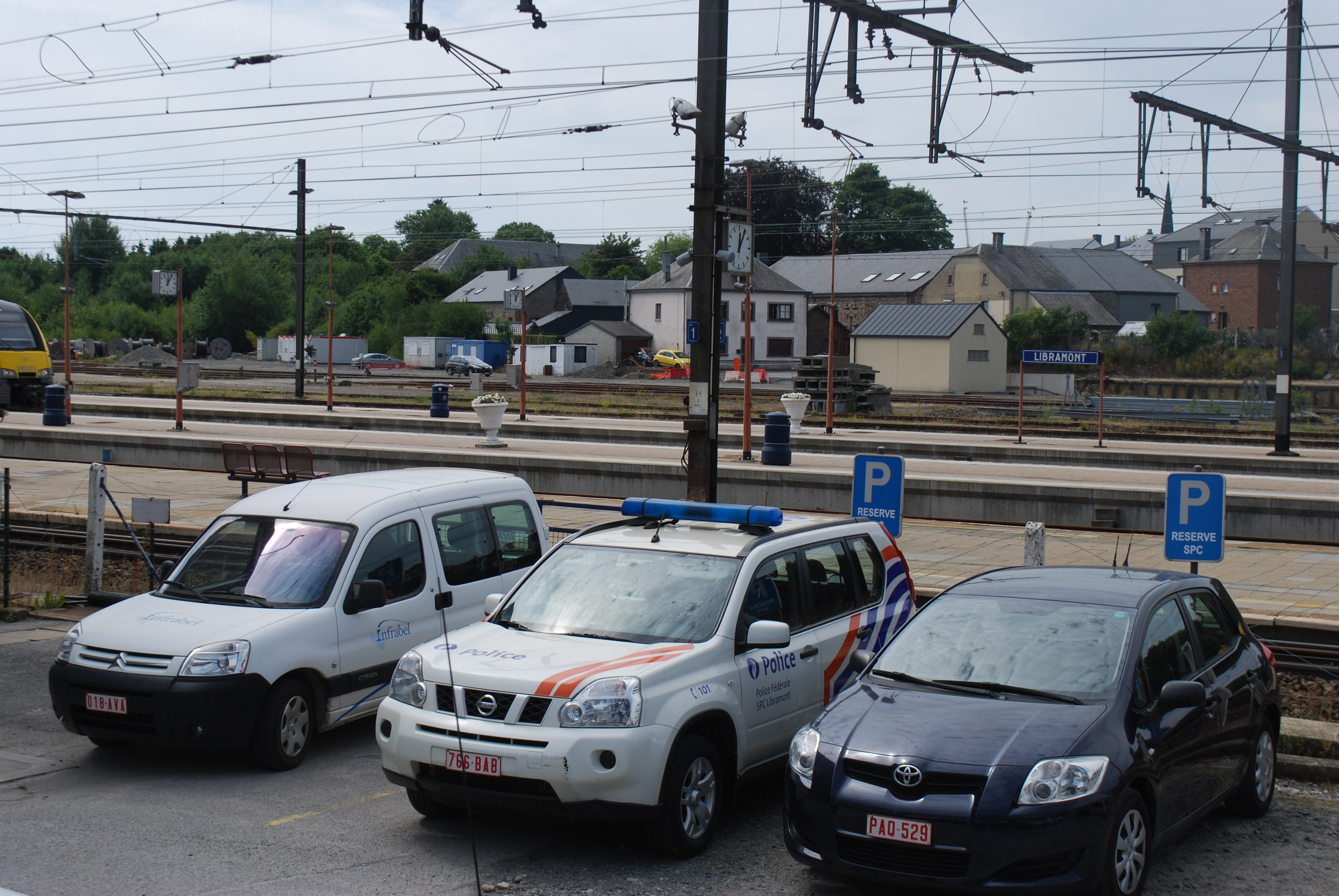
Federal Police patrol from the railway policing unit in Libramont

The Federal Police (Dutch: Federale Politie; French: Police Fédérale; German: Föderale Polizei) is the national police force of the Kingdom of Belgium. It carries out specialized and supra-local administrative and judicial police operations, and supports local police services when needed. Additionally, the Federal Police is responsible for patrolling and ensuring the safety of the country's highways. The Federal Police has approximately 12,300 officers and civilian personnel.

The Federal Police is commanded by General Commissioner (CG) Eric Snoeck, who holds the rank of chief commissioner. He is in charge of the General Commissioner's Office, which comprises three general directorates: the General directorate of the administrative police (DGA), the General directorate of the judicial police (DGJ) and the General directorate of resources and information (DGR). Each general directorate is led by a general director (DG), who also holds the rank of chief commissioner.

== History ==
The FP was created through merging units of the Belgian Gendarmerie and local/municipal police forces on January 1, 2001.

== Divisions ==
=== General Commissioner's Office (CG) ===
The General Commissioner 's Office (Dutch: Commissariaat-Generaal; French: Commissariat-Général; German: Generalkommissariat) incorporates all the top-level central services of the Federal Police. It is commanded by the General Commissioner who directs and manages the Federal Police and ensures regular contact with the Local Police. The Office is responsible for integrated police operations, coordination, cooperation with local police and foreign police, intelligence gathering and management, dispatching and external communication.

==== Directorates of the Commissioner General's Office (CG) ====
- Directorate of the international police cooperation (CGI)
- Directorate of the communication (CGC)
- Directorate of the well-being (CGWB)
- 13 decentralised Directorates of Coordination and Support (CSD/DCA)
  - Intervention Corps (CIK) (11 platoons)

The Directorate of International Police Cooperation (CGI) is Belgium's national central bureau for the European Police Office (Europol), Schengen Information System and International Criminal Police Organization (Interpol).

The General Commissioner's Office also includes decentralized Coordination and Support Directorates (CSD/DCA) located in each judicial district. The CSDs, headed by coordinating directors (DirCo's), represent the Federal Police in the field and act as the link between the Local and the Federal Police. They play a key role in the integrated functioning of Belgium's police, together with the decentralized Directorates of the Judicial Police (FGP/PJF) which are also present in each judicial district. The CSD/DCAs offer support (logistical, personnel-related, managerial) and coordination to both local police forces and the other federal police units. In other words: the CSD/DCA's provide mainly administrative police services, while the FGP/PJFs offer judicial police services.

The Coordination and Support Directorates of the capital city of each province and of Brussels each command a platoon of the federal police's non-specialized intervention reserve: the Intervention Corps (CIK). The CIK consists of 500 non-specialized police officers which can be requested by local police forces and federal units for support in diverse missions.

=== General directorate of the administrative police (DGA) ===
This general directorate, abbreviated as DGA (Dutch: Algemene Directie Bestuurlijke Politie; French: Direction Générale Police Administrative; German: Generaldirektion Verwaltungspolizei), is the uniformed branch of the Belgian Federal Police which provides both specialized and supra-local services. Its counterpart is the General Directorate of Judicial Police, containing the non-uniformed investigative personnel. The Administrative Police consists of several directorates which command the different federal police units. The DGA performs administrative police operations such as traffic policing on the main roads, waterway policing on the North Sea and waterways, railway policing on the railways and in the stations, air policing at the national airport and in the five regional airports, immigration and border control, air and police dog support. The members of this general directorate also carry out protection missions, such as escorting the transport of valuables or the protection of royal palaces.

Moreover, the directorate supports the administrative authorities and the Local Police, for instance by supplying specialized staff and equipment (water cannons, etc.) for order maintenance missions.

==== The directorates of the DGA ====
- Directorate of the operations of administrative police (DAO)
- Directorate of the road police (DAH)
- Directorate of the railway police (SPC)
- Directorate of the waterway police (SPN)
- Directorate of the aviation police (LPA)
- Directorate of air support (DAFA)
- Directorate of canine support (DACH)
- Directorate of public security (DAS)
- Directorate of protection (DAP)

The Directorate of protection (DAP) consists of two units: its Royal Palaces Security Detachment is responsible for protecting the Belgian royal family and their palaces, while the other unit of DAP, its Security Detachment at the SHAPE protects the SHAPE headquarters which is located at Casteau north of the Belgian city of Mons.

The Road Police has approximately 1000 officers who monitor traffic on the major highways.

The Waterway Police regulates ship navigation on inland waterways and on the North Sea.

The Railway Police is divided into five divisions and its 470 officers patrol the railways and stations to prevent crime and damage to rail property.

The Directorate of the aviation police maintains security at Brussels International Airport and at five regional airports. Finally, the immigration and border protection police is responsible for manning border crossing points and controlling immigration.

The Directorate of air support offers specialized support to the police such as event management (traffic jams, plane crashes, crowds, sporting events, etc.). The group's five helicopters and two planes also search for missing people, suspects, clandestine laboratories, etc. The protection of VIPs and the transport of funds is also part of the mission. Some of their activities were documents in the series 101 Unité Aérienne.

The Directorate of canine support has 35 dog teams. Some dogs are trained to detect drugs, human remains, hormones or fire accelerants. About a third are tracker dogs trained to find or identify living people. These teams are often deployed to earthquake areas to locate people trapped in collapsed buildings. The federal police's explosive detector dogs are attached to the CGSU special units.

=== General directorate of the judicial police (DGJ) ===
The General Directorate of the Judicial Police (Dutch: Algemene Directie Gerechtelijke politie; French: Direction Générale Police Judiciaire; German: Generaldirektion Gerichtspolizei) is a large component that operates at both the central level (from its Brussels-based headquarters) and local levels (through local directorates (FGP/DPJ) in each judicial district).

==== The directorates of the DGJ ====
The DGJ's 4 central directorates coordinate serious crime investigations at the national and international level:

- Central Directorate of the operations of judicial police (DJO)
- Central Directorate of the fight against serious and organized crime (DJSOC)
- Central Directorate of the technical and scientific police (DJT)
- Directorate of special units (DSU)
- 14 local Directorates of Judicial Police (FGP/PJF)

The Central Directorate of the operations of judicial police (DJO) manages the use and payment of police informants. It also coordinates and supports the operations of the decentralised investigation bureaux. The DJO also manages the national center for police information management and criminal analysis. Moreover, the operations section assists in the deployment of special units.

The Central Directorate of the fight against serious and organized crime (DJSOC) combats organised crime at the strategic level as well as the operational and tactical levels. Its purview currently includes Italian Mafia, Asian, Balkan, Russian and Hells Angels crime gangs. The DJC also operates the Belgian witness protection program.

The Central Directorate of the technical and scientific police (DJT) operates the fingerprint identification system and maintains laboratories for forensic and scientific work, audio and video analysis, and research and development. Other sections concentrate on profiling, special interrogation techniques and polygraphs.

The Directorate of the special units (DSU) is Belgium's police special units (with an intervention unit, an observation unit and a technical unit at the central level, and the five so-called Protection, Observation, Support and Arrest (POSA) platoons at the decentralized level), but also encompasses the Disaster Victim Identification unit.

==== The directorates of the DGJ (FGP/PJF) ====
Eighty-five percent of the DGJ's personnel is assigned to 14 local investigation directorates, abbreviated as FGP/PJF. Manpower at each district varies: small bureaus can have as few as 40 personnel whereas the large ones can exceed 200. The organisation and management of these units are entrusted to the judicial directors (DirJud) (Dutch:gerechtelijk directeur/French: directeur judiciaire/German: Justizdirektor). Each local FGP/PJF is made up of several sections directed towards the region's main criminal phenomena and executes specific support or criminal investigation missions. Although organisation differs from one district to another, sections dealing with drugs, people smuggling, financial and organized crime, vehicle theft rings are the most common. In addition, the PJF/FGP provides support services for the federal and local police, such as computer crime units, technical and forensic support, criminal information, operational criminal analysis and coordination with the administrative police.

==== Communication and information service of the district (SICAD) ====
Each judicial district has a "Communication and information service of the district" (Dutch: Communicatie- en informatiedienst van het arrondissement; French: Service d’information et de communication d’arrondissement; German: Stadtinformations- und Kommunikationsdienst), which is part of the Coordination and support directorate of each district. The SICADs are staffed by federal and local police officers that gather, assess and spread intelligence and information within the local and federal police forces. This is to facilitate the coordination of investigations and even day-to-day police operations. Each SICAD processes the criminal data from the local and federal police forces to analyze recent cases and events, thus identifying trends and issuing any necessary warnings. It also correlates the connections between cases, people, vehicles, etc. and sorts information for operational and strategic purposes. Each SICAD contributes to the cross-border exchange of police data and supports the managers of the police zones with data processing capabilities. Each chief of investigations has overall responsibility for a SICAD but a department chief ensures the daily management of the centre.

=== General directorate of resources and information (DGR) ===
The DGR (Dutch: Algemene directie van het middelenbeheer en de informatie; French: Direction Générale de la gestion des ressources et de l'information; German: Generaldirektion der Verwaltung von Mitteln und Informationen) performs the administrative, resource management, logistical and recruitment support for all federal police units and for local police forces in limited terms. The department also provides the local and federal police with equipment, support and training.

==== The directorates of DGR (PLIF) ====
- Directorate of human resources (personnel) (DRP)
  - National Police Academy (ANPA)
- Directorate of logistic resources (DRL)
- Directorate of police information and ICT (DRI)
- Directorate of finance (DRF)

The Directorate of human resources (DRP) is, among other things, responsible for the recruitment and the training programs for the entire Belgian police. It analyses training needs and drafts a global training plan for the integrated police. As a think-thank, this directorate provides advice regarding the training of the involved agencies. Specific educational tools are regularly developed by the directorate, either upon request or at its own initiative. DRP ensures the proper application of the various training programs by means of managerial contracts with police academies and by approving training programs. Thus it ensures the conformity of training quality and guarantees financial equity between police academies. It represents Belgium on the governing board of the European Police College (CEPOL) and pilots cross-border police training projects with France, the Netherlands and Luxembourg.

The Directorate of police information and ICT (DRI) is responsible for the management of police information and ICT. For police information shall mean any information any information as operational in nature within the meaning of article 44/1 of the law on the police function as information that supports the police organization as a whole. In this respect, they particularly support the preparation of the policy and rules on management and processing of the information., the development of police information concept, the definition of standards and technical standards, the implementation of systems information and communication.

=== Police Academies ===
Belgium's police academies provide all the basic, specialized, revision and advanced courses for all the members of the integrated police, whether from the federal or local police. There are two types of police academies: the National Police Academy (ANPA) and the ten approved police schools. The ANPA provides specialized and refresher training of all kinds for all personnel (training for specialists 'use of force with/without firearms', training for gold commanders and silver commanders, etc.), the training for commissioners and chief commissioners and the training for investigation officers (general training, training for computer crime investigations, training for technical and scientific investigations, training for operational crime analysis, etc.).

Every province in the country except Walloon Brabant has a police training institution. These academies are either non-profit organisations or provincial or interregional institutions. There are a total of ten (in Bruges, Ghent, Antwerp, Genk, Asse, Liège, Arlon, Namur, Jurbise and one for the Brussels region which is bilingual). A managerial contract between the Interior Minister and the school's management is concluded annually. Even though these schools are not directly part of the police structure, they play an essential role in police training.

== Identification ==
Simplified logo of the Belgian Federal Police in French, with the distinguishable orange line below.

Among the elements of police identification are the orange line below the logo, two orange lines on the hood, and a single orange line on the sides of federal patrols, as well as by the orange lines next to the officers' name badges and ranks, unlike to local police who display light blue lines.

== Ranks ==
The ranks of the Federal Police are the same as those in use in local police forces. The ranks currently are civic, as opposed to the paramilitary ranks that were in use in the former Belgian Rijkswacht/Gendarmerie, which was the Federal Police's main predecessor. This was chosen during the 1998–2001 reformation of the Belgian police forces to emphasize the change to a less militaristic police force, because paramilitary traits were considered less transparent as well as less approachable and thus less desirable.

The difference between local police and the Federal Police is shown by the different colors of the styling lines (orange for the Federal Police and light blue for local police) on the insignia, which are worn on the left chest pocket flap. Officers of both entities are hierarchically equal. Auxiliary officers are rather rare within the Federal Police and can mainly be found in the Air Police where they are deployed for traffic control at the Belgian airports.

Group		Officer level					Middle-level			Base-level		
Insignia		EHCP polfed	CDP polfed	ECP polfed	CP polfed	ACP polfed	EHINP polfed	INPP polfed	AINPP polfed	EINP polfed	INP polfed	AINP polfed
Title	English	First chief commissioner	Chief commissioner	First commissioner	Commissioner	Candidate commissioner	First chief inspector	Chief inspector	Candidate chief inspector	First inspector	Inspector	Candidate inspector
Title	Dutch	Eerste Hoofdcommissaris	Hoofdcommissaris	Eerste commissaris	Commissaris	Aspirant-commissaris	Eerste hoofdinspecteur	Hoofdinspecteur	Aspirant-hoofdinspecteur	Eerste inspecteur	Inspecteur	Aspirant-inspecteur
Title	French	Premier commissaire divisionnaire	Commissaire divisionnaire	Premier commissaire	Commissaire	Aspirant-commissaire	Premier inspecteur principal	Inspecteur principal	Aspirant-inspecteur principal	Premier inspecteur	Inspecteur	Aspirant-inspecteur
Title	German	Erster Hauptkommissar	Hauptkommissar	Erster Kommissar	Kommissar	Kommissar-Anwärter	Erster Hauptinspektor	Hauptinspektor	Hauptinspektor-Anwärter	Erster Inspektor	Inspektor	Inspektor-Anwärter
Group		Security-level								Auxiliary-level		
Insignia		1BCSP polfed	BCSP polfed	1BASP polfed	BASP polfed	ABASP polfed	1BAGP polfed	BAGP polfed	ABAGP polfed	EAP polfed	AP polfed	AAP polfed
Title	English	First security coordinator	Security coordinator	First security assistant	Security assistant	Candidate security assistant	First security officer	Security officer	Candidate security officer	First (auxiliary) officer	(Auxiliary) officer	Candidate (auxiliary) officer
Title	Dutch	Eerste beveiligingscoördinator	Beveiligingscoördinator	Eerste beveiligingsassistent	Beveiligingsassistent	Aspirant-beveiligingsassistent	Eerste beveiligingsagent	Beveiligingsagent	Aspirant-beveiligingsagent	Eerste agent	Agent	Aspirant-agent
Title	French	Premier coordinateur de sécurisation de police	Coordinateur de sécurisation de police	Premier assistant de sécurisation de police	Assistant de sécurisation de police	Aspirant assistant de sécurisation de police	Premier agent de sécurisation de police	Agent de sécurisation de police	Aspirant agent de sécurisation de police	Premier agent	Agent	Aspirant-agent
Title	German	Erster Sicherungskoordinator der Polizei	Sicherungskoordinator der Polizei	Erster Sicherungsassistent der Polizei	Sicherungsassistent der Polizei	Sicherungsassistent-Anwärter der Polizei	Erster Sicherungsbediensteter der Polizei	Sicherungsbediensteter der Polizei	Sicherungsbediensteter-Anwärter der Polizei	Erster Polizeibediensteter	Polizeibediensteter	Polizeibediensteter-Anwärter

== Equipment ==
=== Weapons ===
Such weapons listed out is used to equip ordinary officers. Federal Police Special Units possibility would gain other weaponry including rifles, machine guns, grenade launchers and sniper rifles depend on the situation encountered.

Weapon	Origin	Type	Notes
Smith & Wesson M&P	USA	Semi-automatic pistol	Standard issue sidearm
Glock pistol	Austria	Semi-automatic pistol	
Steyr AUG	Austria	Submachine gun	9mm variant
Uzi	Israel; Belgium	Submachine gun	Made under license by FN Herstal
Heckler & Koch MP5	Germany	Submachine gun	
Heckler & Koch UMP	Germany	Submachine gun	
FN SCAR	Belgium	Assault rifle	

== See also ==
- Belgian Royal Escort
