= Stop Child Abuse – Trace an Object =

European law enforcement campaign to identify child pornography perpetrators

- Owner: Europol
- Website: www.europol.europa.eu/stopchildabuse
- Commercial: No
- Launched: 31 May 2017; 9 years ago
- Current status: Online

Stop Child Abuse – Trace an Object is an online campaign by Europol that shows objects which appear in the background of child sexual abuse material footage. Europol asks people to visit this website and to look at the objects. By identifying objects, the project aims to find and aid victims, situate crime scenes, and apprehend perpetrators.

Europol believes that having many people trying to identify the objects will expedite the investigative process, allowing individual law enforcement agencies to identify perpetrators and victims of child abuse faster. Individuals may submit information about objects anonymously without further contact from Europol or other law enforcement agencies. Europol's Victim Identification Task Force established the Trace an Object website as part of an overall effort to curb abuse crimes and human trafficking.

== History ==
Europol launched the Stop Child Abuse – Trace an Object campaign via a dedicated web page on 31 May 2017, at Europol's headquarters in the Hague, Netherlands. The impetus for the campaign was an overall rise in child sexual abuse material, including perpetrators' use of the dark web to facilitate their illegal distribution of child sexual abuse material and the recent history of investigators' ability to solve similar crimes because of details such as logos. On launch day, the web page showed 20 images for possible identification by the public. By 12 June 2017, Europol had received 10,000 contributions (information about an image displayed on the Trace an Object site) from the public.

Since launching the site in May 2017, Europol has had success in tracing several of the objects and locations depicted. In August, it was reported that a hotel room had been traced to the Maldives after a Twitter user identified it.

Europol uses social media such as Twitter (@Europol) and Facebook to solicit help from the public.

In March 2021, the Australian Centre to Counter Child Exploitation announced that it had released its own Trace an Object campaign.
