= Jürgen Storbeck =

German law enforcement officer (born 1946)

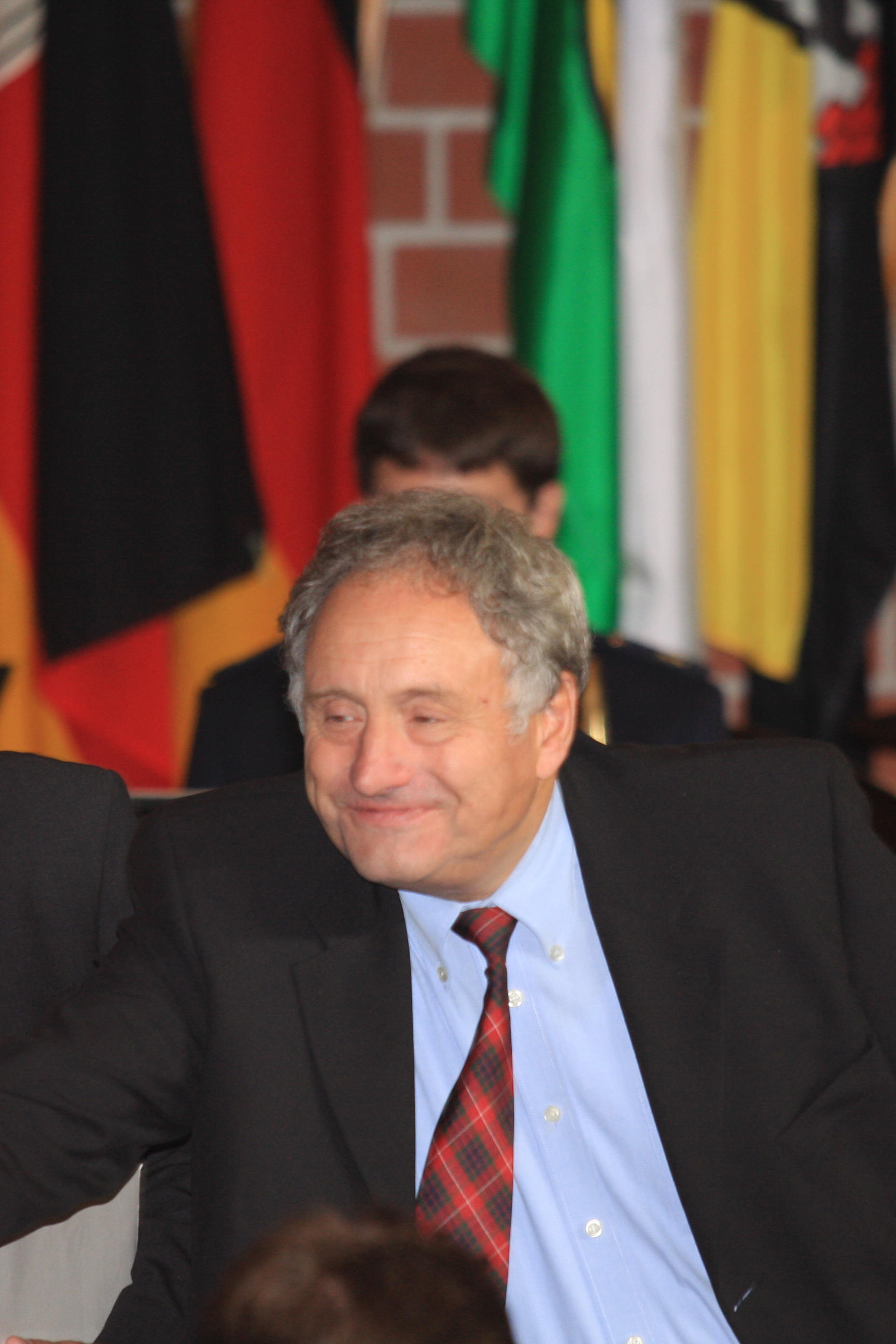
- Storbeck in 2011

Executive Director of Europol
- In office 1999–2005
- Succeeded by: Max-Peter Ratzel

Personal details
- Born: 1946 (age 79–80) Flensburg, Germany
- Education: University of Bonn, University of Tübingen, LMU Munich
- Profession: Law Enforcement

Jürgen Storbeck (born 1946 in Flensburg, Germany) is a German law enforcement officer. He served as Director of Europol between 1999 and 2005.

== Education ==
Storbeck studied law at the University of Bonn, LMU Munich, and the University of Tübingen.

== Career ==
After passing the second state examination in 1977, Director Storbeck started his career in the department of the higher services of the Bundeskriminalamt (BKA) in Wiesbaden, Germany as a superintendend. In 1983, he became the head of the department of the International Legal Assistance and Investigation.

In 1990, he transferred in the Ministry of Interior, where he was responsible for the re-organization of the former Judicial Police. From 1991 on, he was the Head of the Central Bureau of Interpol, which is part of the Federal Criminal Police office.

In 1992, Director Storbeck was transferred to The Hague, to a newly emerging European Police organization (Europol).

== Europol ==
In 1994, he took over the administration of the "Drug Unit" of Europol, while in 1999 he became its General Director, a position that he held until 2004 that he was succeeded by Max-Peter Ratzel.

On his return to Germany, he was transferred to the Federal Ministry of Interior, becoming in charge of the Police co-operation with the States of the Gulf. Storbeck is now serving as the Head of the Department of the Ministry of Brandenburg.

== Honors ==
- 2004: Order of Merit of the Federal Republic of Germany, 1st Class

== Selected works ==
- Global Organised Crime and Future Security Arrangements, in: Robertson-von Trotha, Caroline Y. (ed.): Organised Crime. Dark Sides of Globalisation (= Kulturwissenschaft interdisziplinär/Interdisciplinary Studies on Culture and Society, Vol. 8), Baden-Baden 2012

== See also ==
- B.K.A.
- Europol
