= Europol =

European Union law enforcement agency

European Union Agency for Law Enforcement Cooperation

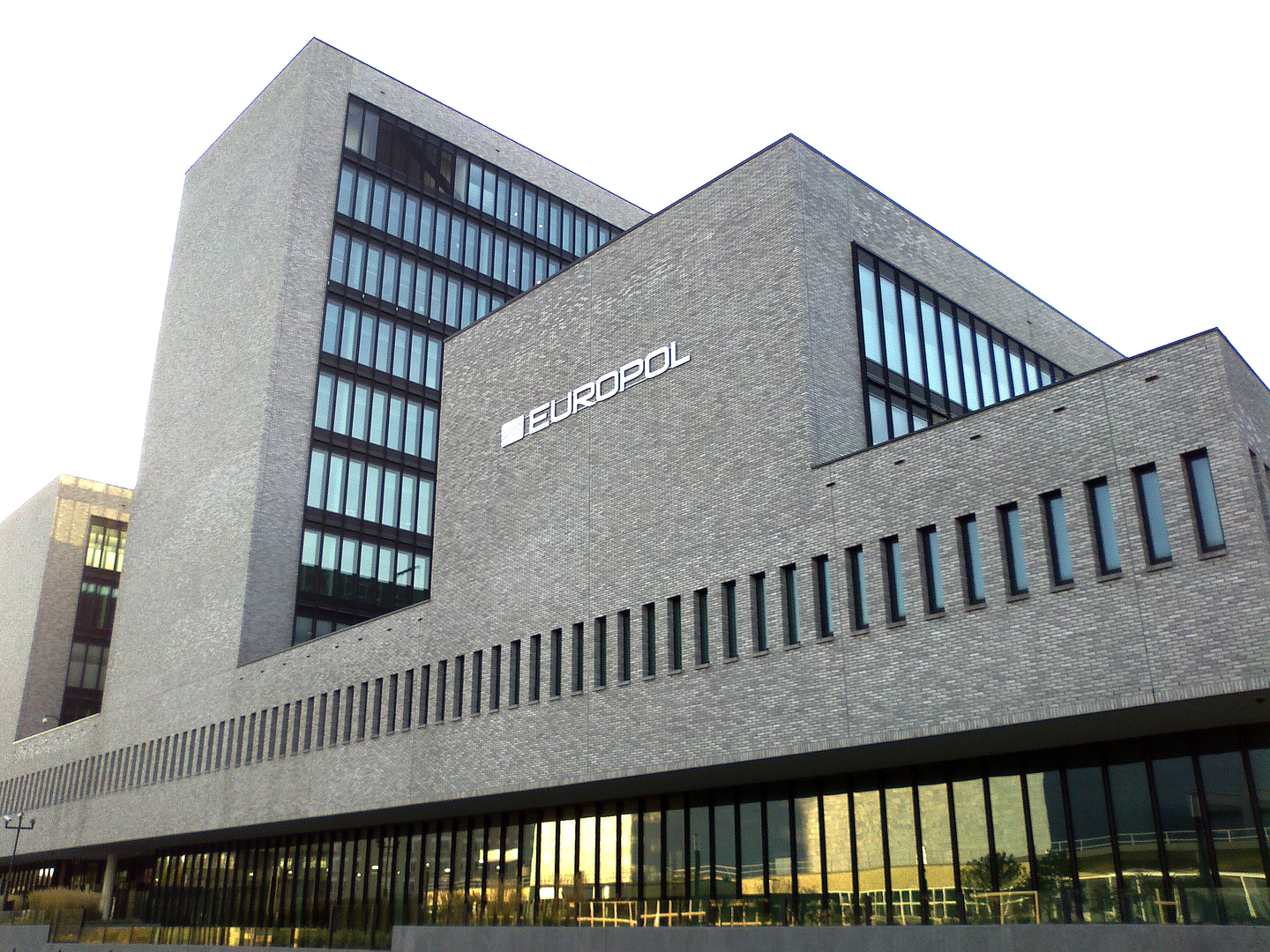
- Europol headquarters in The Hague, Netherlands

Agency overview
- Formed: 1 October 1998
- Preceding agency: European Police Office Europol Drugs Unit
- Jurisdiction: European Union
- Headquarters: Eisenhowerlaan 73 The Hague, Netherlands 52.0928°N 4.2815°E
- Employees: 1,700 (2024)
- Annual budget: €217.1 million (2024)
- Agency executives: (Germany) Jürgen Ebner, acting executive director; (France) Jean-Philippe Lecouffe, deputy executive director for operations; (Romania) Andrei Linta, deputy executive director for capabilities; (Germany) Jürgen Ebner, deputy executive director for governance
- Key document: Regulation (EU) 2016/794
- Website: europol.europa.eu

Map
- Europol (European Union)

Europol, officially the European Union Agency for Law Enforcement Cooperation, is the law enforcement agency of the European Union (EU). Established in 1998, it is based in The Hague, Netherlands, and serves as the central hub for coordinating criminal intelligence and supporting the EU's member states in their efforts to combat various forms of serious and organized crime, as well as terrorism.

Europol's main objective is to enhance the effectiveness and cooperation between the law enforcement agencies of the EU member states. To achieve this, Europol facilitates the exchange of information and intelligence, provides analytical support, and offers specialized training and expertise. Some of the key areas of focus for Europol include drug trafficking, human trafficking, cybercrime, money laundering, and counterterrorism.

The Agency has no executive powers, and its officials are not entitled to arrest suspects, conduct independent investigations, or act without prior approval from competent authorities in the member states. Instead, Europol's role is to support and facilitate the efforts of national law enforcement agencies within the EU.

== History ==
=== Origins and establishment ===
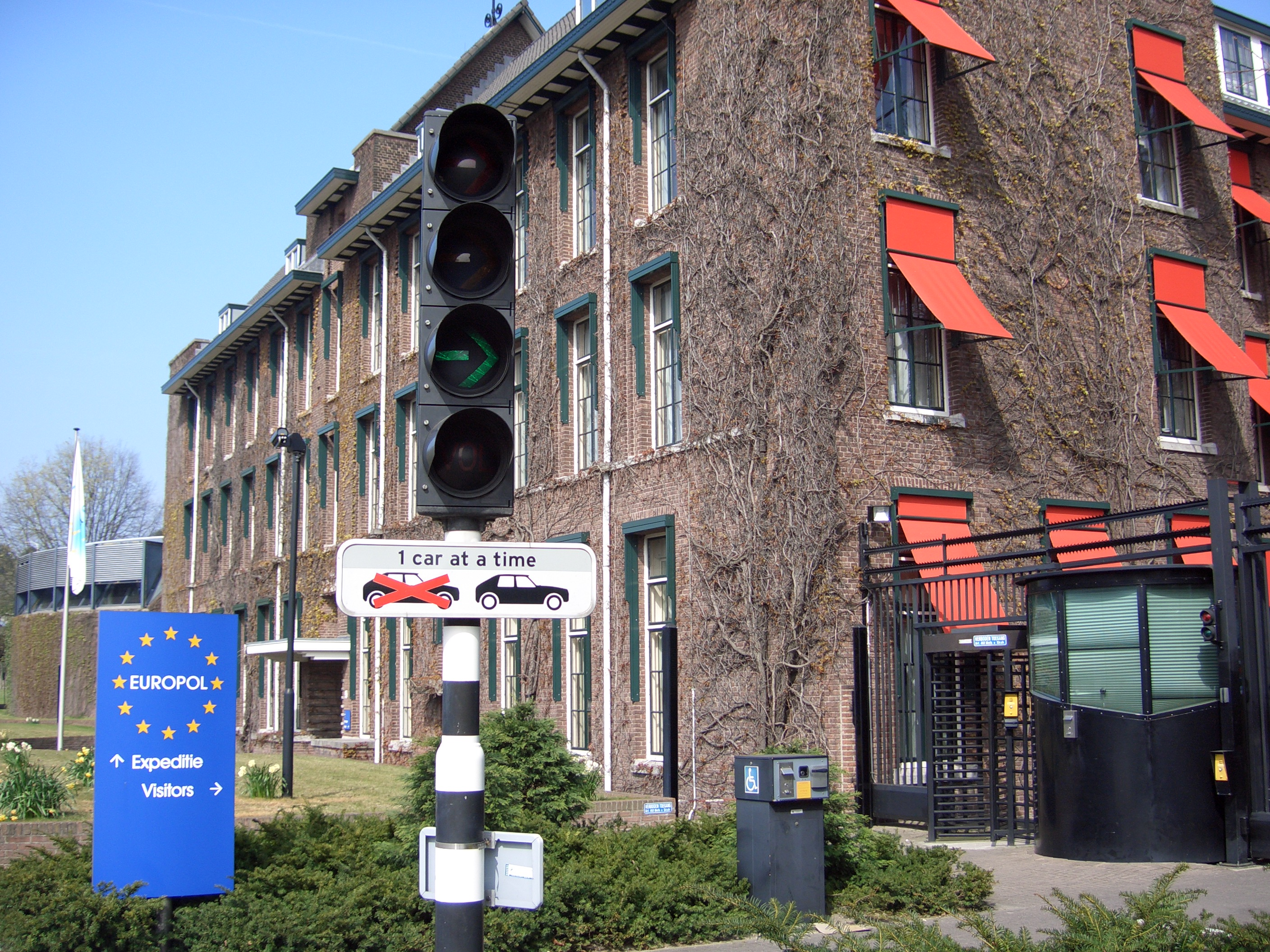
Europol headquarters from 1994 to 2011 in The Hague, pictured in 2007

Europol has its origins in TREVI, a forum for security cooperation created amongst European Community interior and justice ministers in 1976. At first, TREVI focused on international terrorism, but soon started to cover other areas of cross-border crime within the Community. At the European Summit in Luxembourg on 28–29 June 1991, German chancellor Helmut Kohl called for the creation of a European police agency similar to the Federal Bureau of Investigation (FBI)—thus sowing the seeds of police cooperation across Europe. At the Summit, the European Council agreed to establish "a Central European Criminal Investigations Office (Europol) by 31 December 1993 the latest."

The idea of the Luxembourg Summit was further elaborated at the European Council in Maastricht on 9–10 December 1991, a meeting to draft the Maastricht Treaty. The European Council agreed to create "a European police office (Europol) the initial function of which would be to organize exchange of information on narcotic drugs". The Council likewise instructed TREVI ministers to take measures in setting up the office. On 7 February 1992, Europol was enshrined with more substance in Article K.1, section 9, as the Maastricht Treaty was signed:

[...] Member States shall regard the following areas as matters of common interest: [...] police cooperation for the purposes of preventing and combatting terrorism, unlawful drug trafficking and other serious forms of international crime, including if necessary certain aspects of customs cooperation, in connection with the organization of a Union-wide system for exchanging information within a European Police Office (Europol).

Europol was first de facto organised provisionally in 1993 as the Europol Drugs Unit (EDU) in Strasbourg at the same site as the Schengen Information System was hosted. The small initial group started operations there in January 1994 under the leadership of Jürgen Storbeck and with a mandate to assist national police forces in criminal investigations. The competition for the permanent site of Europol during the period was between The Hague, Rome and Strasbourg—the European Council decided on 29 October 1993 that Europol should be established in The Hague. A former Roman Catholic boys school built in 1910 at Raamweg 47 was chosen as the precise location. The house was used in World War II by police and intelligence agencies and after the War staffed by the Dutch State Intelligence Service until Europol relocated there later in 1994.

The Europol Convention was signed on 26 July 1995 in Brussels and came into force on 1 October 1998 after being ratified by all the Member States. The European Police Office (Europol) commenced its full activities on 1 July 1999.

=== Reformation as a European Union agency ===
Europol was fully integrated into the European Union with Council Decision 2009/371/JHA of 6 April 2009. It replaced the Europol Convention and reformed Europol as an EU agency (i.e. subject to the general rules and procedures applicable to all EU agencies) on 1 January 2010 due to different aspirations, such as enhanced support to Member States on countering serious and organised crime, budgetary control by the European Parliament, and administrative simplification.

The Agency's new 32 000 m^{2} headquarters building, designed by Frank Wintermans, was opened by then Queen, now Princess Beatrix of the Netherlands on 1 July 2011 in the international zone of The Hague next to the International Criminal Tribunal for the former Yugoslavia (ICTY) and the Organisation for the Prohibition of Chemical Weapons (OPCW) at Eisenhowerlaan 73.

=== European Cybercrime Centre ===
On 11 January 2013, Director Rob Wainwright and European Commissioner for Home Affairs Cecilia Malmström launched the European Cybercrime Centre (EC3 or EC^{3}), a unit of Europol tasked with assisting Member States to dismantle and disrupt cybercrime committed by organised groups to generate large criminal profits (e.g. online fraud), causing serious harm to victims (e.g. online child sexual exploitation) or affecting critical infrastructure and systems in the EU. The purpose of the centre is to coordinate cross-border law enforcement activities against cybercrime and act as a centre of technological expertise, such as tool development and training. Commissioner Malmström stated that the need for a cybercrime centre in Europe was "to protect the open and free internet". On 25 January 2016, the European Counter Terrorism Centre (ECTC) was launched as a new strategic platform within Europol to share information among EU states in tracking movements of Europeans into and from Syria as well as to monitor terrorists' finances and militants' Internet usage.

Between 27 and 29 May 2024, Operation Endgame, led by France, Germany and the Netherlands and coordinated from Europol's headquarters, targeted dropper malware including IcedID, SystemBC, Pikabot, Smokeloader and Bumblebee. The actions resulted in four arrests and more than 100 servers being taken down or disrupted. Europol described it as the largest ever operation against botnets.

=== Exceptions to opt-out ===
When the UK exercised its opt-out from the area of freedom, security and justice in 2014, its request to continue participating in Europol was approved.

Denmark was not permitted to participate in the 2016 recast Europol Regulation due to its opt-out from the area of freedom, security and justice. In a December 2015 referendum it rejected converting its opt-out to a case-by-case opt-in, which would have allowed it to participate in the new regulation and remain a member of Europol. However, Denmark and the European Union agreed on a co-operation deal in December 2016. The agreement was accepted by both the European Parliament and the Danish Parliament on 27 April 2017 and subsequently signed on 29 April 2017—two days before Denmark would have been cut off from the Agency.

The UK also did not originally participate in the recast 2016 Europol Regulation, but subsequently notified the EU of its desire to participate in December 2016. Its participation was confirmed by a Commission Decision in March 2017. In September 2017, it was reported that the United Kingdom was planning to hold onto Europol access, such as intelligence sharing and co-operation in fighting crime and terrorism, after Brexit through a new treaty. However, the EU's chief negotiator Michel Barnier said in November 2017 that the UK "will no longer be a member of the European Defence Agency or Europol" after Brexit takes effect.

=== Activities regarding counter-terrorism ===
The European Parliament approved Europol's new legal framework, Regulation (EU) 2016/794, on 11 May 2016 after three years of negotiations and thus repealed the former Decisions of 2009. The new framework granted additional powers on counter-terrorism to Europol, but also includes adding training and exchange programmes for staff, creating a solid data protection system, and strengthening the Parliament's control over the Agency. The Regulation took effect on 1 May 2017. Additionally, the full name was amended to European Union Agency for Law Enforcement Cooperation (Europol).

In March 2026, Europol published a warning saying that rising tensions due to the war in Iran could increase the risk of terrorism in the EU. Europol stated that the situation might inspire violent extremism, attacks by lone actors, and cyberattacks across member states and that online propaganda and disinformation related to the conflict could accelerate radicalisation.

=== Activities against child sexual abuse ===
Europol started the Stop Child Abuse – Trace an Object campaign and website on 31 May 2017. The site's objective is to display objects in child sexual abuse images to try to find the perpetrators and victims — in the hope that distinct details, such as a logo on a bag or a shampoo bottle, can be identified by the public who can then forward the information by an anonymous tip-off or social media. The approach was called crowdsourcing by the investigators. Bellingcat, the investigative search network, reported that several objects had been positively identified following its attempt to support Europol's call.

As of May 2024, Europol led 14 Victim Identification Task Force events which resulted in over 700 children identified and rescued with about 230 offenders arrested.

== Tasks and activities ==
Europol is mandated by the European Union (EU) to assist EU Member States in the fight against international crime, such as illicit drugs, trafficking in human beings, intellectual property crime, cybercrime, euro counterfeiting and terrorism, by serving as a centre for law enforcement co-operation, expertise and criminal intelligence. Europol or its officials do not have executive powers — and therefore they do not have powers of arrest and cannot carry out investigations without the approval of national authorities.

Europol reported it would focus on countering cybercrime, organised crime, and terrorism as well as on building its information technology capacities during the 2016–2020 strategy cycle, . Europol likewise stated that the previous strategy cycle of 2010–2014 laid the foundation for the Agency as the European criminal information hub. The EU Serious and Organised Crime Threat Assessment (SOCTA) of 2017 identified eight priority crime areas: cybercrime; drug production, trafficking and distribution; migrant smuggling; organised property crime; trafficking in human beings; criminal finances and money laundering; document fraud; and online trade in illicit goods and services.

Additionally, the Agency's tasked activities in detail include analysis and exchange information, such as criminal intelligence; co-ordination of investigative and operational action as well as joint investigation teams; preparation of threat assessments, strategic and operational analyses and general situation reports; and developing specialist knowledge of crime prevention and forensic methods. Europol is to coordinate and support other EU bodies established within the area of freedom, security and justice, such as the European Union Agency for Law Enforcement Training (CEPOL), the European Anti-Fraud Office (OLAF), and EU crisis management missions. The Agency is also directed to assist the European Council and the European Commission in developing strategic and operational priorities.

In 2016 it co-founded the No More Ransom project. In February 2024 Europol and Eurojust coordinated Operation Cronos in Europe. This international task force was led by the UK National Crime Agency and seized servers used by the LockBit ransomware group.

=== Publications ===
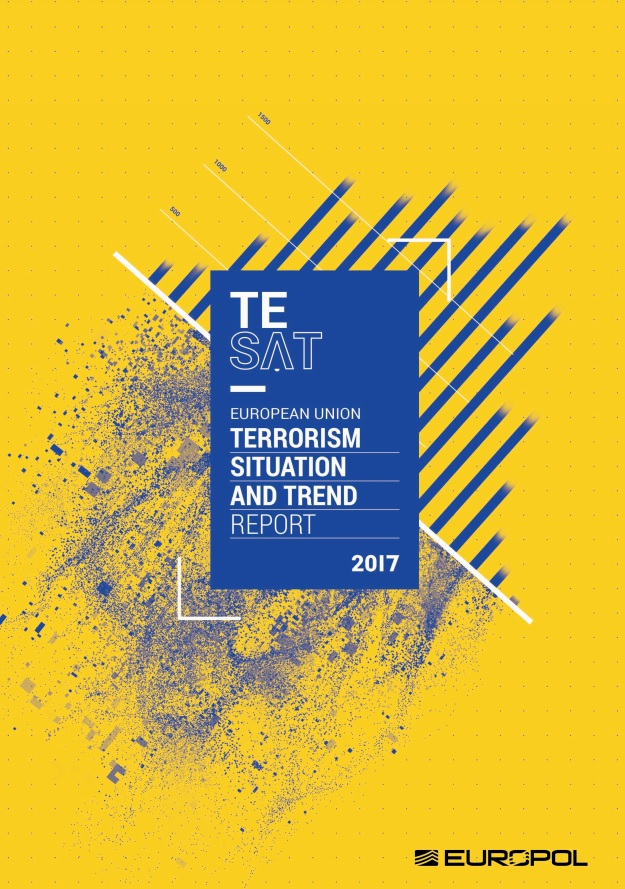
Cover of the Terrorism Situation and Trend Report (TE-SAT) 2017

Europol has published the annual Terrorism Situation and Trend Report (TE-SAT) since 2007. This report provides an overview of terrorism within the EU over the previous year. It includes statistics on foiled, failed and completed terrorist attacks, arrests, and the number of deaths and injuries caused by terrorism within the 13 member states.

=== European Financial and Economic Crime Centre ===
On 4 May 2020, Europol launched the new European Financial and Economic Crime Centre (EFECC). The Centre aims to enhance the operational support provided to the EU Member States and EU bodies in the fields of financial and economic crime and promote the systematic use of financial investigations.

On 2 December 2020, Europol initiated the European Money Mule Action (EMMA) and collaborated with 26 countries in coordinating the EMMA 7 operation. This effort led to the identification of more than 18,000 money mules and resulted in 1,803 arrests. Successfully carrying out anti-money laundering operations like this may serve as a deterrent and convey a message about AML compliance to cryptocurrency businesses throughout various states.

The new EFECC has been set up within the current organisational structure of Europol that is already playing an important part in the European response to financial and economic crime and will be staffed with 65 international experts and analysts.

== Organisation ==
In the financial year 2017, the Agency's budget was approximately 116.4 million euros. As of December 2016, Europol has 1065 staff, of which 32.3% are female and 67.7% male, including employment contracts with Europol, liaison officers from Member States and third states and organisations, Seconded National Experts, trainees and contractors. Of the staff, 201 are liaison officers and around 100 analysts. In addition to the Management Board and Liaison Bureaux, Europol is organised into three different departments under the Executive Director:

- Operations (O) Department
  - O1 Front Office
  - O2 European Serious and Organised Crime Centre (ESOCC)
  - O3 European Cybercrime Centre (EC^{3})
  - O4 European Counter Terrorism Centre (ECTC)
  - O5 Horizontal Operational Services (HOS)
- Governance (G) Department
  - G1 Corporate Affairs Bureau (CAB)
  - G2 Corporate Services
  - G3 Procurement
  - G5 Security
- Capabilities (C) Department
  - C1 ICT
  - C5 Administration

== Governance, accountability and relations ==
The Europol Directorate, the day-to-day leadership of the Agency, is appointed by the EU Justice and Home Affairs Council (JHA) for four-year terms. As of 2018, the agency is headed by executive director Catherine De Bolle. The Agency is accountable to and controlled by the Justice and Home Affairs Council. Together with the European Parliament, the Council approves Europol's budget and regulations related to its work. The Council forwards an annual special report to the European Parliament on the work of the Agency — and the Parliament also discharges Europol from its responsibility for managing a set budget. Before 2009, the Agency was an international body and thus the European Parliament lacked effective scrutiny powers over it. From 2009 to 2017, the European Parliament had been the sole organ in parliamentary control of Europol. The Joint Parliamentary Scrutiny Group (JPSG) was created at the EU Speakers Conference in Bratislava on 23–25 April 2017 to allow both the European Parliament and national EU parliaments to exert control over Europol.

The Europol Management Board comprises representatives from all of the Member States and from the European Commission, each having one vote. Decisions of the Board require a supermajority and it meets at least twice per year on Europol's current and future activities as well as on adopting the budget, programming material and general annual reports. The board forwards its decisions to the Justice and Home Affairs Council for perusal. The Management Board functions include data protection, internal audit and accountancy.

External financial oversight of the Agency is conducted by the European Court of Auditors (ECA); for example, ECA evaluated Europol in 2017 on anti-radicalisation programmes. Internal control is carried out by the Internal Audit Service of the European Commission as well as by the Europol Management Board-appointed Internal Audit Function. The European Ombudsman is tasked with investigating complaints against EU institutions and bodies, including Europol, as well as assisting to create a more transparent, effective, accountable and ethical administration. As of 1 May 2017, the European Data Protection Supervisor (EDPS) has been responsible for supervising the agency's data protection measures.

The Director of Europol is able to enter into agreements for Europol with other countries and international organizations. As of September 2017, Europol co-operates on an operational basis with Albania, Australia, Bosnia and Herzegovina, Canada, Denmark, Colombia, Georgia, Iceland, Liechtenstein, Moldova, Monaco, Montenegro, North Macedonia, Norway, Serbia, Switzerland, Ukraine, United States, and Interpol. Similarly, the Agency has strategic agreements with Armenia, Brazil, China, Russia, Turkey, United Nations Office on Drugs and Crime (UNODC), and World Customs Organization (WCO).

== See also ==
- Cross Channel Intelligence Community
- European Dactyloscopy (Eurodac)
- eu-LISA
- Eurojust
- European Arrest Warrant (EAW)
- European Border and Coast Guard (Frontex)
- European Central Bank
- European Monitoring Centre for Drugs and Drug Addiction (EMCDDA)
- European Union Agency for Network and Information Security
- European Union Intellectual Property Office
- European Union Police Mission (EUPOL)
- Police Union of German States
- Prüm Convention
- Schengen Information System (SIS)
- Visa Information System
