= INOGATE =

International energy co-operation programme

INOGATE Interstate Oil and Gas Transportation to Europe
- Logo
- Headquarters: Tbilisi; Kyiv
- Type: Intergovernmental organization

Establishment
  - Established: 1996
  - Disestablished: 2016
- Website http://www.inogate.org/?lang=en

Interstate Oil and Gas Transportation to Europe (INOGATE) was an international energy co-operation programme between the European Union (EU), the littoral states of the Black and Caspian seas and their neighbouring countries. The programme was operational from 1996 to 2016.

INOGATE was one of the longest running energy technical assistance programmes funded by the EU. Up to 2006, it was funded by the Tacis Regional Cooperation Programme, and as of 2007, it was funded by the European Neighbourhood and Partnership Instrument (ENPI) under the ENPI-East Regional Indicative Programme 2007–2010 and 2010–2013. EuropeAid supported the programme through the ENPI and the Development Cooperation Instrument. The coordinating INOGATE Technical Secretariat was discontinued in April 2016.

== Origins ==
INOGATE originated in 1995 as an EU support mechanism dealing with INterstate Oil and GAs Transportation to Europe (whence it derived its name as an acronym). It was particularly concerned initially with oil and gas pipelines running from and through Eastern Europe and the Caucasus to the EU. In 2001, a formal 'Umbrella Agreement' was signed by twenty-one countries in Kyiv, to cooperate on pipeline development and enhancement. Following conferences in Baku, Azerbaijan in 2004 and in Astana, Kazakhstan, INOGATE evolved into a broader energy partnership between the EU and countries of the former Soviet Union, (excluding the Russian Federation and the Baltic States, but including Turkey), and concentrating on four key topics:

- enhancing energy security
- convergence of member state energy markets on the basis of EU internal energy market principles
- supporting sustainable energy development
- attracting investment for energy projects of common and regional interest.

== Partner countries ==
The INOGATE partner countries are:

- Armenia
- Azerbaijan
- Belarus
- Georgia
- Kazakhstan
- Kyrgyzstan
- Moldova
- Turkey
- Turkmenistan
- Ukraine
- Uzbekistan
- Tajikistan
- Russian Federation (observer status only)

Turkey is an INOGATE partner country and was, therefore, regularly invited to attend INOGATE meetings but it is not a beneficiary country.

== The Baku Initiative and the Astana Declaration ==
The Baku Initiative resulted from a policy dialogue on energy cooperation between the European Union and the INOGATE partner countries. The initiative was announced on 13 November 2004 at the Energy Ministerial Conference in Baku. A second Ministerial Conference was held in Astana on 30 November 2006 which confirmed the broader remit of the INOGATE programme to cover a range of energy issues in the Partner Countries and their cooperation in these issues with the EU.

One objective of the Baku Initiative is to enhance integration of the energy markets of participating countries with the EU energy market, so as to create transparent energy markets, capable of attracting investment and enhancing security of energy supply. The partner countries agreed objectives to harmonise legal and technical standards so as to create a functioning integrated energy market in accordance with EU and international legal and regulatory frameworks; to increase the safety and security of energy supplies by extending and modernising existing infrastructure, substituting outdated power generation infrastructures with environmentally friendly systems; the development of new infrastructures and implementation of modern monitoring systems; improvement of energy supply and demand management through the integration of efficient and sustainable energy systems; and promotion of the financing of commercially and environmentally viable energy projects of common interest. A 'road-map' towards achievement of these and allied objectives was adopted at the Astana Ministerial Conference.

== Structure and activities ==
The coordinating body of INOGATE was the Technical Secretariat based in Kyiv, Ukraine, with regional offices in Tbilisi, Georgia, and in Tashkent, Uzbekistan. The INOGATE Secretariat had an important role in ensuring the visibility, the coordination, coherence and sustainability of the programme as a whole as well as the individual projects.

The Baku Initiative is implemented through the four working groups, each of which contains members from all partner countries:

- Harmonisation of Legal, Regulatory and Institutional framework for market liberalisation
- Enhancing Safety and Security of Energy Transportation Networks
- Sustainable development
- Investment Attraction and Project Facilitation

A number of specific projects, financed by the ENPI, were associated with the INOGATE programme, and are listed at the INOGATE webportal. These projects included initiatives to improve safety and security of oil and gas transit structures, to develop coordinated national energy policies in Central Asia, and to support market integration and sustainable energy initiatives in partner countries.

INOGATE was closely involved with the development of the Eastern European Regional Centre for Hydrocarbon Metrology in Boyarka, Ukraine, which 'provides state-of-the-art calibration services for gas transfer within the region and to other countries'. This should form an important element in the development of a regional energy market operating to Western European standards.

The INOGATE programme had an ongoing schedule of conferences and publications. Its webportal contained regularly updated information and news on energy developments in partner countries and relevant EU initiatives and policies.

The programme supported reduction in Partner Countries, their dependency on fossil fuels and imports, improvement of the security of their energy supply, and climate change mitigation.

== Projects ==
An 'INOGATE Project' was any EU-funded regional energy project supporting energy policy cooperation in the INOGATE Partner countries in the topics of the four INOGATE areas of cooperation. Since the inception of the Programme in 1996, approximately 61 INOGATE projects have been implemented.

In the period 2010-2015 there were three active INOGATE projects:

- INOGATE Technical Secretariat (ITS) and integrated programme in support of the Baku Initiative and the Eastern Partnership energy objectives; Duration: 02/2012-01/2015, Total value: €16.6 million
- Energy Saving Initiative in the Building Sector in the Eastern European and Central Asian Countries; Duration: 01/2010 - 12/2013, Total value: €4.5 million
- Sustainable energy programme for Central Asia: renewable energy sources and energy efficiency; Duration: 01/2013-12/2015, Total value: €4 million.

In addition to the INOGATE projects, there was also the following INOGATE-related project (not directly promoted as an INOGATE project but using INOGATE funding and encouraging the same objectives):

- Supporting Participation of Eastern European and Central Asian Cities in the 'Covenant of Mayors' (INOGATE-related project); Duration: 09/2011 - 09/2013, Total value: €2.15 million

Each of the individual projects was responsible for ensuring visibility of their actions. However the ITS project promoted their results in the wider framework of the INOGATE Programme.

== See also ==
- Energy Community
- Energy policy of the European Union
- Energy Charter Treaty
- TRACECA
