= Micronesia–European Union relations =

European Union–Federated States of Micronesia relations

- European Union: Federated States of Micronesia

European Union–Federated States of Micronesia relations are the foreign relations between the country of the Federated States of Micronesia and the European Union. Cooperation between Micronesia and European Union was initiated in 2000 when the country joined the Organisation of African, Caribbean and Pacific States and is developed in the framework of Cotonou Agreement within the wider ACP–EU development cooperation. Two sides formalized their direct diplomatic relations on 18 April 2002 when the European Union ambassador Frans Baan (residing in the Delegation of the European Union for the Pacific based in Suva, Fiji) attended diplomatic credential ceremony in Palikir. In 2008 the designated national authorizing officer for EU programs Fabian Nimea visited several EU member countries to promote further cooperation between his country and the European Union.

In its donors policy European Union acknowledges particular role of the United States aid in many sectors including education and health and is therefore focused on the creation of development synergies. European Development Fund allocated 17 million € for a period between 2014 and 2020 to address some of the critical consequences of climate change including introduction of sustainable energy sources, emergency management and environmental protection. Together with Marshall Islands and Palau, Micronesia cooperated with the European Union within the 2017-2020 EU–North Pacific–Readiness for El Niño (RENI) project with the budget of 4,5 million €. In 2016 two parties signed the agreement on the short-stay visa waiver. Total minuscule EU imports from Micronesia amounted to about €129,000 in 2019 and with 63% of Micronesia's exports to the EU nominally eligible for Generalized System of Preferences but with only 74% of eligible items actually using them.
