= Papua New Guinea–European Union relations =

European Union–Papua New Guinea relations
- European Union: Papua New Guinea

Cooperation between Papua New Guinea and the European Union is developed in the framework of Cotonou Agreement within the wider ACP–EU development cooperation. While neighboring Australia as the largest donor is the only country which provides direct budget supports, European Union is one of the major other sources of international assistance in the country. Since 2011 European Union is the second largest export market accounting for 9.2% of total exports by the country.

Papua New Guinea was one of the countries in the region actively involved in initiatives to replace the Lomé Convention with the Regional Economic Partnership Agreement with EU, ultimately leading to a couple of separate bilateral agreements. Papua New Guinea signed Lome II, III and IV Conventions in which it identified rural and human resources development as principal sectors for development assistance.

In 2002, the European Commission Election Exploratory mission visited the country but advised against full scale EU electoral observation of the 2002 Papua New Guinean general election due to security concerns. In 2007 two sides signed an interim-Economic Partnership Agreement exempting tariff and quota limitations for canned tuna and smoked loins produced in Papua New Guinea. Two sides signed 2014-2020 National Indicative Programme (NIP) by which European Union committed allocation of 184 million € of development aid subdivided into 85 million for rural entrepreneurship, investment and trade, 60 million for water, sanitation and hygiene, 30 million for education and 9 million for support measures.

In March 2021, in the context of vaccine dispute between Brussels and Canberra, Prime Minister of Australia Scott Morrison urged European Union to send 1 million COVID-19 vaccines to Papua New Guinea, the request which was accepted following month.
