= Marjeta Jager =

European civil servant

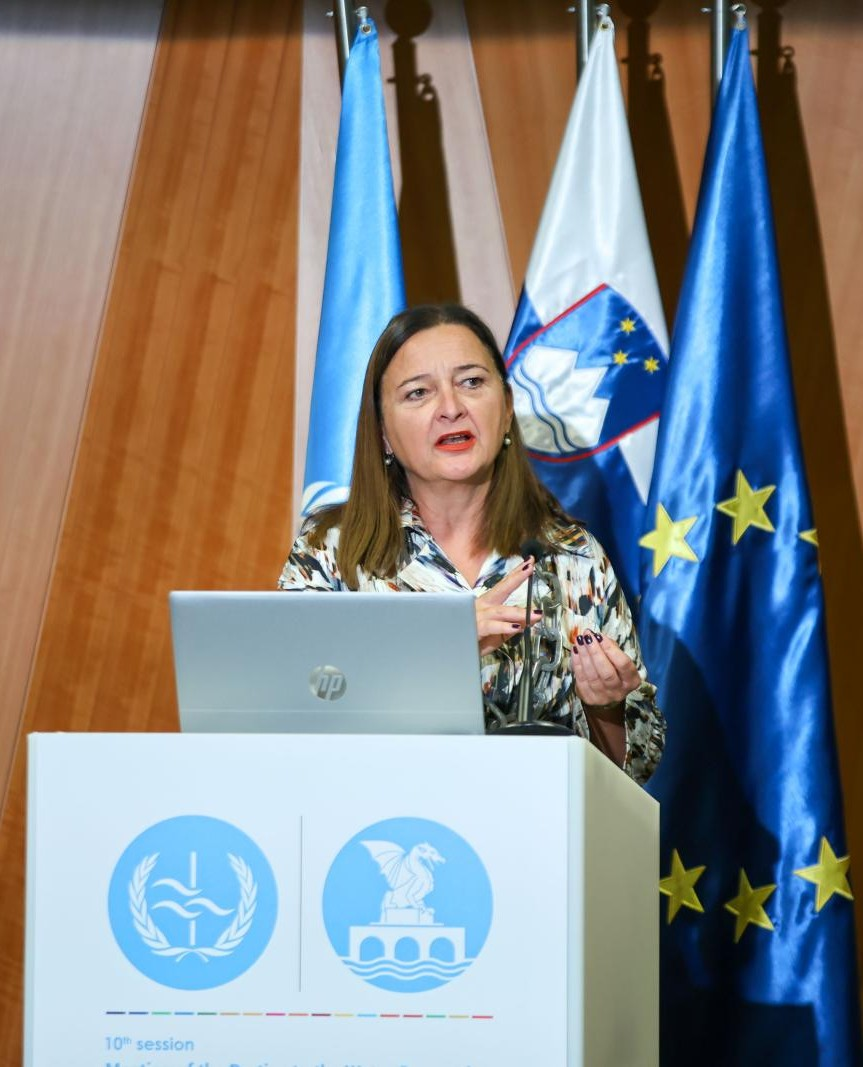
- Jager in 2024

Deputy Director-General of INTPA
- Incumbent
- Assumed office 16 January 2021 Serving with Martin Seychell and Myriam Ferran
- Commission: Von der Leyen I and II
- Director-General: Koen Doens

Personal details
- Citizenship: Slovenia
- Education: University of Ljubljana
- Occupation: European civil servant
- Profession: Lawyer

Marjeta Jager is a European civil servant of Slovenian nationality who has served as a Deputy Director-General of the Directorate-General for International Partnerships (DG INTPA) of the European Commission since January 2021, responsible for coordinating its Directorates D, E and F. She had held the equivalent post in the directorate-general's predecessor, DG DEVCO, since January 2016.

Before joining the Commission in 2005, Jager spent more than a decade at the Slovenian Ministry of Foreign Affairs working on Slovenia's accession to the European Union and served as the country's first Deputy Permanent Representative to the EU. Within the Commission she worked for a decade on transport and energy before moving to development policy.

== Education ==
Jager studied at the Faculty of Law of the University of Ljubljana from October 1986 to June 1991, taking a bachelor's degree in law together with the bar examination in international law. She is qualified as a barrister.

== Career ==
=== Slovenian diplomatic service (1991–2005) ===
Jager joined the Slovenian Ministry of Foreign Affairs in October 1991 as a counsellor in its European Department, where she remained until October 1995. From October 1995 to September 1999 she served as First Secretary with responsibility for enlargement, the Common Foreign and Security Policy, justice and home affairs, and legal affairs.

She was appointed head of cabinet to the Minister for European Affairs, with the rank of State Under-Secretary, at the Government Office for European Affairs in October 1999, serving until February 2002, and then spent six months as State Under-Secretary in the cabinet of the Minister of Foreign Affairs.

From September 2002 to April 2005 Jager was Deputy Permanent Representative of Slovenia to the European Union with the rank of Minister Plenipotentiary, representing the country in Coreper I. She was the first person to hold that position for Slovenia.

=== Transport and energy (2005–2016) ===
Jager joined the European Commission in May 2005 as a Director in the former Directorate-General for Energy and Transport (DG TREN), responsible for the development and implementation of EU legislation on the security of persons, goods and installations. In April 2008 she took over the directorate for general policy and international energy, covering inter-institutional relations, communication, international energy relations and enlargement. In that capacity she represented the Commission in the EU-Russia energy dialogue and at the International Energy Agency.

Following the split of DG TREN, she served from March 2010 as a Director in the Directorate-General for Mobility and Transport (DG MOVE), with a portfolio spanning inter-institutional relations, communication, international relations, enlargement, impact assessment, passengers' rights, public service obligations, infringements and policy coordination.

In an interview with the Nordic Investment Bank in December 2010, Jager discussed the Northern Dimension Partnership for Transport and Logistics, established under a memorandum of understanding signed in October 2009. She described 2010 as a turning point for the partnership, with agreement on its secretariat and budget, attributing the progress to the engagement of all partners. On the role of international financial institutions, she argued for a long-term view extending beyond transport infrastructure to softer measures and said the region could become attractive for investment provided that priorities reflected genuine regional commitments rather than purely national needs.

She was seconded in November 2014 to establish the cabinet of the incoming Commissioner for Transport, Violeta Bulc, serving as her head of cabinet until May 2015 before returning to DG MOVE as Director responsible for transport security, inter-institutional relations, communication, economic analysis and impact assessment, legal matters and infringements, and policy coordination.

=== International cooperation and development (2016–2021) ===
On 16 January 2016 Jager became a Deputy Director-General of the Directorate-General for International Cooperation and Development (DG DEVCO), coordinating its Directorates C, G and H together with the task force on knowledge, performance and results.

In October 2016 she took part in the Habitat III conference on housing and sustainable urban development in Quito, speaking at special sessions on urban infrastructure and basic services and on informal settlements, and at a networking event on cities combating urban poverty. In November 2019 she contributed to the Peace Globe installation at the Paris Peace Forum, on the theme of Europe's passage from war to peace.

In May 2020 Jager met the Deputy Director-General of the Food and Agriculture Organization, Beth Bechdol, together with other DG DEVCO officials, to discuss the effects of the COVID-19 pandemic on food and agriculture. Both sides emphasised the 'humanitarian-development-peace nexus' and the need to engage the private sector in transforming global food systems, particularly in Africa, which was contending simultaneously with the pandemic and a desert locust infestation.

=== International partnerships (2021–present) ===
When DG DEVCO was reorganised and renamed International Partnerships, Jager was made responsible from 16 January 2021 for coordinating Directorates D, E and F.

==== Blended finance and development instruments ====
In an interview with the Spanish development finance institution COFIDES published in September 2021, Jager set out the case for blended finance in EU development cooperation. She described blending as a flexible instrument that channels additional finance to sectors important to partner countries' priorities, gives investors access to markets they would otherwise avoid and can be used to raise investment volumes, subsidise interest rates, provide risk capital and guarantees and improve the investment climate. She reported that since operations began in 2007, EU grants exceeding €8 billion had leveraged around €70 billion in loans from financial institutions and regional development banks, generating total investment of more than €115 billion, and cited the Huruma Fund, the first project managed by COFIDES under the EU blending facility, as an example of underwriting private-sector risk to reach farmers and small producer organisations.

Discussing inequality, Jager argued that reducing it is a goal rather than a single implementable measure and that the pandemic had underlined the link between societal resilience and the capacity of health and education systems. She noted that under the Neighbourhood, Development and International Cooperation Instrument - Global Europe, with a budget of €79.5 billion for 2021-2027, the Commission was aiming for at least 20 per cent of funding to go to human development and for education's share to rise from 7 to 10 per cent. On the External Investment Plan, she described the successor European Fund for Sustainable Development Plus (EFSD+) as extending coverage to all partner countries rather than only sub-Saharan Africa and the neighbourhood, with an External Action Guarantee of up to €60 billion; under the original fund, she said, €5.4 billion had been committed between 2017 and 2020 to more than 180 blending projects and 15 guarantees. She also stated that the EU was the largest donor to the COVAX initiative and that the EU and its member states were the largest global providers of public climate finance to developing countries, having committed around €22 billion in 2019.

==== Water cooperation ====
Jager has represented the Commission on international water policy. In October 2024, on the margins of the tenth Meeting of the Parties to the UN Water Convention in Ljubljana, she received the Ivorian Minister of Water and Forests, Laurent Tchagba, who presented eight project proposals worth more than 31 billion CFA francs. Two were described as ready for implementation: the rehabilitation of fourteen water reservoirs and the construction of the Kouban hydro-agricultural dam. Jager confirmed the EU's support and encouraged Côte d'Ivoire - which had acceded to the convention in July 2024 as its fifty-third party and tenth African member - to join networks and bodies concerned with integrated water resources management.

In an interview with the International Network of Basin Organizations (INBO) published in December 2024, Jager described water as a key driver underpinning all the Sustainable Development Goals, noting that the EU had disbursed €2.6 billion in the 2014-2020 programming period and committed a further €1.4 billion between 2021 and 2023, with the EU making over €1.1 billion available for transboundary water cooperation across eighteen major basins in Africa and Central Asia.

She argued that European experience is instructive because transboundary river basins cover 60 per cent of the continent's territory, forcing cooperation and that managing shared resources cooperatively builds peace and prosperity, citing the Danube and its nineteen riparian countries. The Water Framework Directive of 2000, she said, gave water managers across Europe a common reference covering the whole water cycle, while its river basin districts, which cut across administrative boundaries, created new democratic spaces for states to discuss shared water bodies. Promoting water democracy, in her account, means involving a wide range of stakeholders so that solutions are transparent, accountable and locally owned.

Explaining the choice of INBO and the French water agency OiEau to lead a peer-to-peer learning project for basin organisations, Jager pointed to INBO's network and to the EU's record with OiEau in implementing the Water Initiative Plus in the Eastern Partnership countries. She favoured a problem-driven approach yielding best-fit rather than generic best-practice solutions and cited exchanges between Brazilian and French basin agencies on drought and flood prevention, as well as support from the Loire-Bretagne agency for watershed planning in the Bandama basin in Côte d'Ivoire.

== Languages ==
Jager's mother tongue is Slovene; she also works in English, French, Croatian and German.
