= Technical Centre for Agricultural and Rural Cooperation ACP-EU (CTA) =

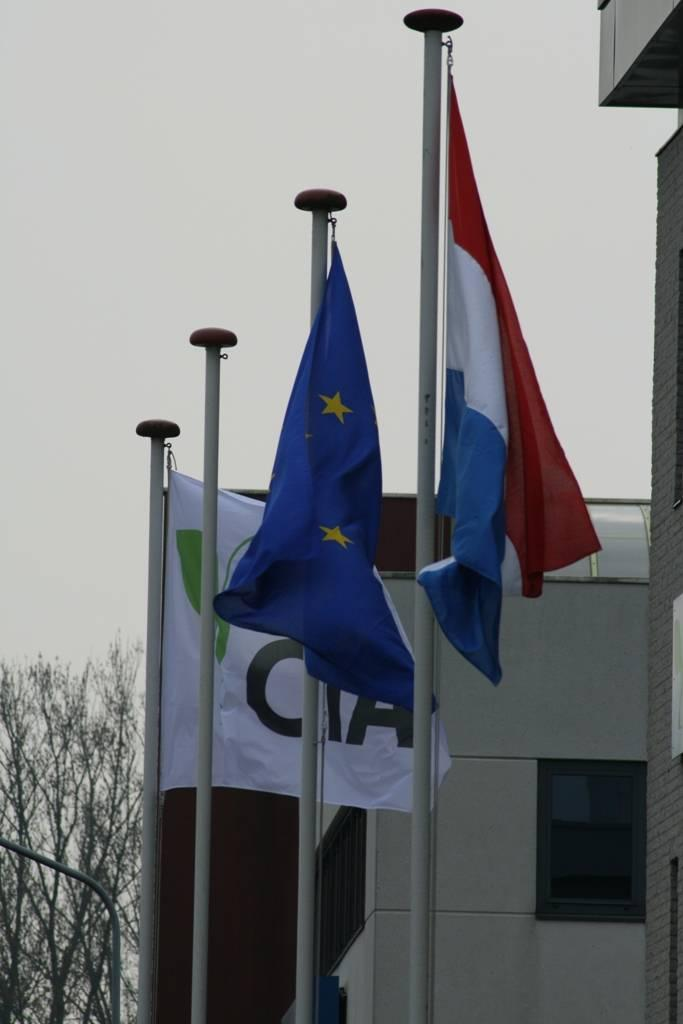
CTA, the EU and Dutch flags are waving in the wind in front of the CTA building in Wageningen, the Netherlands

The Technical Centre for Agricultural and Rural Cooperation ACP-EU (CTA) was established in 1983 under the Lomé Convention between the African, Caribbean and Pacific Group of States and EU member states. Since 2000 CTA has operated within the framework of the ACP-EU Cotonou Agreement with a mission to “strengthen policy and institutional capacity development and information and communication management capacities of ACP agricultural and rural development organisations. It assists such organisations in formulating and implementing policies and programmes to reduce poverty, promote sustainable food security, preserve the natural resource base and thus contribute to building self-reliance in ACP rural and agricultural development.”. The centre is closed in 2020, after the end of the Cotonou Agreement and the subsequent end of its financing.

== Background ==
CTA is mainly funded by the European Union. It initially focused on information dissemination but, more recently, has moved towards implementing some technical programmes. It works primarily with partner organisations at regional level in the Caribbean and Pacific and at sub-regional level in Africa. CTA celebrated its 30th anniversary in Brussels on 4 April 2014. The centre, which is based in Wageningen, the Netherlands, is active in seventy nine ACP countries. It also has an office in Brussels. Although it does not work in non-ACP countries, participants from these countries are welcome to attend its annual conferences and to download its publications. While CTA's resources are derived mainly from the European Development Fund, it also obtains funding from other European programmes, countries or donors through grants or co-funding for operations.

== Key activities ==
=== Programmes ===
CTA focuses on three key areas:

- Multi-stakeholder policy formulation and implementation at national, regional and international levels. Discussion of issues such as food and nutritional security, the impact of climate change on agriculture, regional trade, and agricultural innovation is promoted, with an emphasis on the involvement of farmers’ groups, the private sector, women and youth. CTA works with policy-makers in the ACP and the EU to promote dialogue and convey key policy messages.
- Efficient agricultural value chains. With partners in ACP countries, CTA works to maximize inclusion of smallholders in new, more sophisticated value chains as well as to strengthen their involvement in priority food crop and commodity markets. Improving market information, promoting the flow of finance to and through value chains, and improving capacity of key players at all stages of chains are some of the centre's priority areas, as is the development of agricultural trade by ACP countries.
- Information, communication and knowledge management for agricultural and rural development. To help ACP institutions to promote policies and innovations that can benefit rural communities, CTA publishes both journals and books (including online) and has many specialized websites. It works with ACP countries to develop knowledge management skills and to promote the use of communication channels, old and new, to improve the flow of information (e.g., e-communities, web portals, seminars, and study visits). It has an active programme of training and development for ICT for Development and web 2.0 for Development. It offers a wide range of publications (in English and French) available free of charge to organisations in ACP countries or for free download by all .

=== Conferences ===
CTA organises a major international conference annually on topics closely related to its work programme. Recent conferences have been:

- International conference on Innovations in Extension and Advisory Services, Nairobi, 2011
- Making the Connection: value chains for transforming smallholder agriculture, Addis Ababa, 2012
- ICT4Ag: The digital springboard for inclusive agriculture, Kigali, 2013
- Fin4Ag, a conference on Value Chain finance will be held in Nairobi in July 2014.

=== Products, projects and services ===
CTA's services (available in English and French) include:

- Spore. A bi-monthly magazine circulated in English, French and Portuguese in hard copy in all ACP countries and available online for all, providing information for ACP agricultural development
- ICT Update. A current awareness bulletin on ICT issues for ACP agriculture
- Knowledge for Development. Described as an Observatory on Science, Technology and Innovation for ACP Agricultural and Rural Development
- ARDYS. Agriculture, Rural Development and Youth in the Information Society.
- Brussels Development Briefings. Bi-monthly Briefings on key issues related to agriculture and food security in ACP countries
- Web2forDev Gateway. Updates on Web 2.0 applications used in the context of rural development, highlighting training courses on offer

=== Partner organisations ===
CTA works closely with many regional organisations working in the agricultural sector in ACP countries.

In Africa, these include:

- NEPAD, the New Partnership for Africa's Development
- FANRPAN, Food, Agriculture and Natural Resources Policy Analysis Network
- SACAU, the Southern African Confederation of Agricultural Unions
- EAFF, the Eastern Africa Farmers Federation
- EAGC, the Eastern Africa Grain Council
- IIRR, the International Institute of Rural Reconstruction
- ROPPA, the Network of Farmers' and Agricultural Producers' Organisations of West Africa
- RUFORUM, Regional Universities Forum for Capacity Building in Agriculture
- PROTA, the Plant Resources of Tropical Africa Programme (retired in 2013)

In the Caribbean, partner organisations include:

- CARDI, the Caribbean Agricultural Research and Development Institute
- CaFAN, the Caribbean Farmers Network
- CARICOM, the Caribbean Community
- IICA, the Inter-American Institute for Cooperation on Agriculture

and in the Pacific partners include:

- MSG, the Melanesian Spearhead Group
- Pacific Community (SPC)
- Pacific Island Farmers Organisation Network
- PIPSO, the Pacific Islands Private Sector Organisation
- NARI, Papua New Guinea's National Agricultural Research Institute

At international level, in addition to the European Commission, CTA works closely with UN agencies such as FAO, IFAD, and UNCTAD and with national organisations in the EU, such as CIRAD in France, GIZ in Germany and KIT in the Netherlands, as well as with universities, including Wageningen University.

== See also ==
- Spore (agricultural publication)
