= Koen Doens =

Belgian diplomat and European civil servant

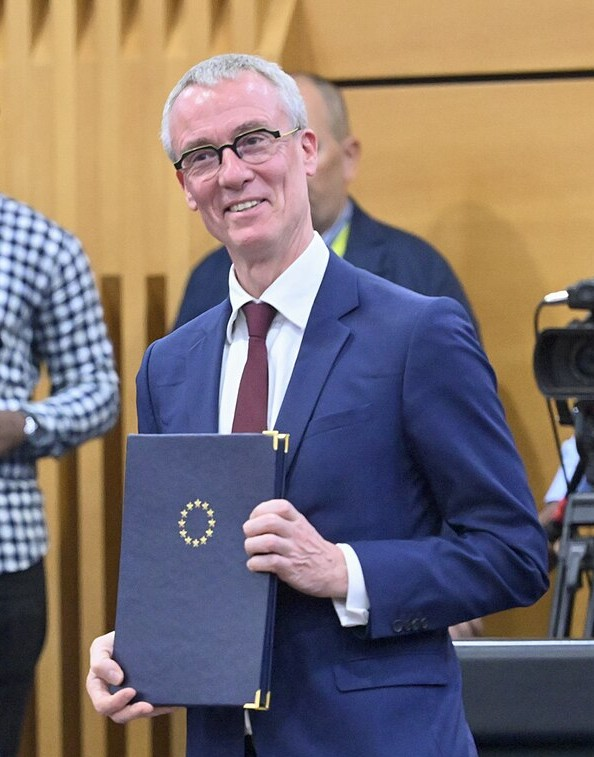
- Doens in Kigali, Rwanda in 2023

Director-General for International Partnerships of the European Commission
- Incumbent
- Assumed office 1 October 2019
- Commission: Von der Leyen I and II
- Preceded by: Stefano Manservisi (as DG of DEVCO)

Deputy Director-General for International Development and Cooperation (DEVCO)
- In office March 2018 – September 2019
- Commission: Juncker

Director for European Union-African Union Relations, East and Southern Africa and Indian Ocean Head of the Task Force on Post-Cotonou (DEVCO)
- In office November 2014 – February 2018
- Commission: Juncker

Head of the Spokespersons' Service
- In office February 2010 – October 2014
- Commission: Barroso II
- Preceded by: Johannes Laitenberger (as Chief Spokesperson)
- Succeeded by: Margaritis Schinas (as Chief Spokesperson)

Head of Cabinet to the Commissioner for Development Cooperation and Humanitarian Aid
- In office November 2007 – October 2009
- Commission: Barroso I
- Commissioner: Louis Michel; Karel De Gucht

Deputy Head of Cabinet to the Commissioner for Development Cooperation and Humanitarian Aid
- In office November 2004 – November 2007
- Commission: Barroso I
- Commissioner: Louis Michel

Deputy Head of Cabinet to the Commissioner for Research
- In office September 2004 – November 2004
- Commission: Prodi; Barroso I
- Commissioner: Philippe Busquin; Louis Michel
Roles in Belgian diplomacy
2003-2004	Adviser on Transatlantic Relations, Russia and Eastern Europe, OSCE, UN, WTO and Terrorism to Foreign Ministers Michel (2003-4) and De Gucht (2004)
2001–2003	Adviser on Multilateral Trade to Foreign Trade Minister Neyts
1998-2001	Head of the Economic Section of the Belgian Embassy in Moscow

Personal details
- Citizenship: Belgium
- Education: University of Antwerp; KU Leuven
- Occupation: European civil servant
- Profession: Classicist; Diplomat

Military service
- Allegiance: Belgium
- Branch/service: Belgian Army
- Years of service: 1987-1988

Koen Doens is a European civil servant and Belgian diplomat who has served as Director-General of the European Commission's Directorate-General for International Partnerships (DG INTPA) since October 2019. A classical philologist by training and a Latin and Greek teacher before entering the Belgian diplomatic service, he is the European Union's most senior official responsible for international development and cooperation policy.

Doens joined the European Commission in 2004 as a member of the cabinet of Development Commissioner Louis Michel, later becoming Michel's head of cabinet and, from 2010 to 2014, head of the Commission's Spokespersons' Service under President José Manuel Barroso. After serving as Director for relations with the African Union and head of the Commission's post-Cotonou task force, and then as Deputy Director-General, he succeeded Stefano Manservisi as Director-General on 1 October 2019.

Doens is closely associated with the reorientation of EU development policy away from grant-based aid and towards investment partnerships. He advocated renaming the Commission's development department from DG DEVCO to DG INTPA in 2021, helped devise the 'Team Europe' coordination approach and the Global Gateway investment strategy and has argued that official development assistance should be used chiefly to leverage other sources of capital. This shift has been criticised by development NGOs and, in more measured terms, by the OECD, as a move towards a more transactional and commercially driven model of cooperation.

== Early life and education ==
Doens completed a bachelor's degree in classical philology at the University of Antwerp (1983-1986) and a master's degree in classical philology at the Katholieke Universiteit Leuven (1986-1987). He underwent military service in the Belgian Army in 1987-1988 and then taught Latin and Greek, first at the Klein Seminarie in Hoogstraten and subsequently at the College Eucharistisch Hart in Essen. He obtained a second master's degree, in international politics, from the University of Antwerp in 1991.

His mother tongue is Dutch; he also speaks French, English, Spanish and German.

== Belgian diplomatic service ==
Doens entered the Belgian Ministry of Foreign Affairs in January 1993. He was posted to the Belgian embassy in Damascus from 1994 to 1998, serving in 1997 as chargé d'affaires at the embassy in Tehran, and headed the economic section of the Belgian embassy in Moscow from 1998 to 2001.

Returning to Brussels, he worked as an adviser on multilateral trade in the cabinet of Minister for Foreign Trade Annemie Neyts (2001-2003) and then on transatlantic relations, Russia and eastern Europe, the OSCE, the United Nations, the WTO and counter-terrorism in the cabinets of Foreign Ministers Louis Michel and Karel De Gucht (2003-2004).

== European Commission ==
=== Cabinets and Spokespersons' Service (2004–2014) ===
Doens moved to the European Commission in September 2004, initially as deputy head of cabinet to Research Commissioner Philippe Busquin and then to Louis Michel, who took over the development and humanitarian aid portfolio in the first Barroso Commission. He was Michel's deputy head of cabinet from 2004 to 2007 and head of cabinet from 2007, continuing in that role under Karel De Gucht in 2009. Following a special assignment in DG Development on the effects of the financial crisis on developing countries, he was appointed head of the Commission's Spokespersons' Service in February 2010, a post he held for the duration of the second Barroso Commission until October 2014.

A 2014 profile in PRWeek described him as an archetypally reserved official who "takes pride in being dull".

=== Africa, post-Cotonou and deputy director-general (2014–2019) ===
From November 2014 to February 2018 Doens was Director for EU-African Union relations, East and Southern Africa and the Indian Ocean within DG DEVCO, and head of the department's Post-Cotonou Task Force, which prepared the successor to the Cotonou Agreement governing relations with the Organisation of African, Caribbean and Pacific States (OACPS). In March 2018 he became Deputy Director-General responsible for Africa, Asia, the Middle East and Gulf, the Pacific and Latin America and the Caribbean.

=== Director-General (2019–present) ===
The Commission appointed Doens Director-General of DG DEVCO on 23 July 2019, with effect from 1 October, following the retirement of Stefano Manservisi. The department was renamed the Directorate-General for International Partnerships on 16 January 2021.

In April 2020 Doens circulated an internal memorandum proposing a coordinated European response to the COVID-19 pandemic in developing countries, warning that the crisis risked being exploited by actors with different agendas and citing China's repositioning as a supporter of affected states. The memorandum gave rise to the 'Team Europe' approach, under which the Commission, EU member states and European development banks pool resources; by early 2022 around 150 Team Europe Initiatives were at various stages of development.

Doens oversaw the programming of the 2021-2027 Neighbourhood, Development and International Cooperation Instrument (NDICI - Global Europe) and the rollout of the Global Gateway strategy, the EU's flagship external investment initiative. He has been described as the civil servant who helped create the Global Gateway brand. In 2025 he announced that the initiative was moving "from startup to scale up", with a focus on fewer and larger flagship projects.

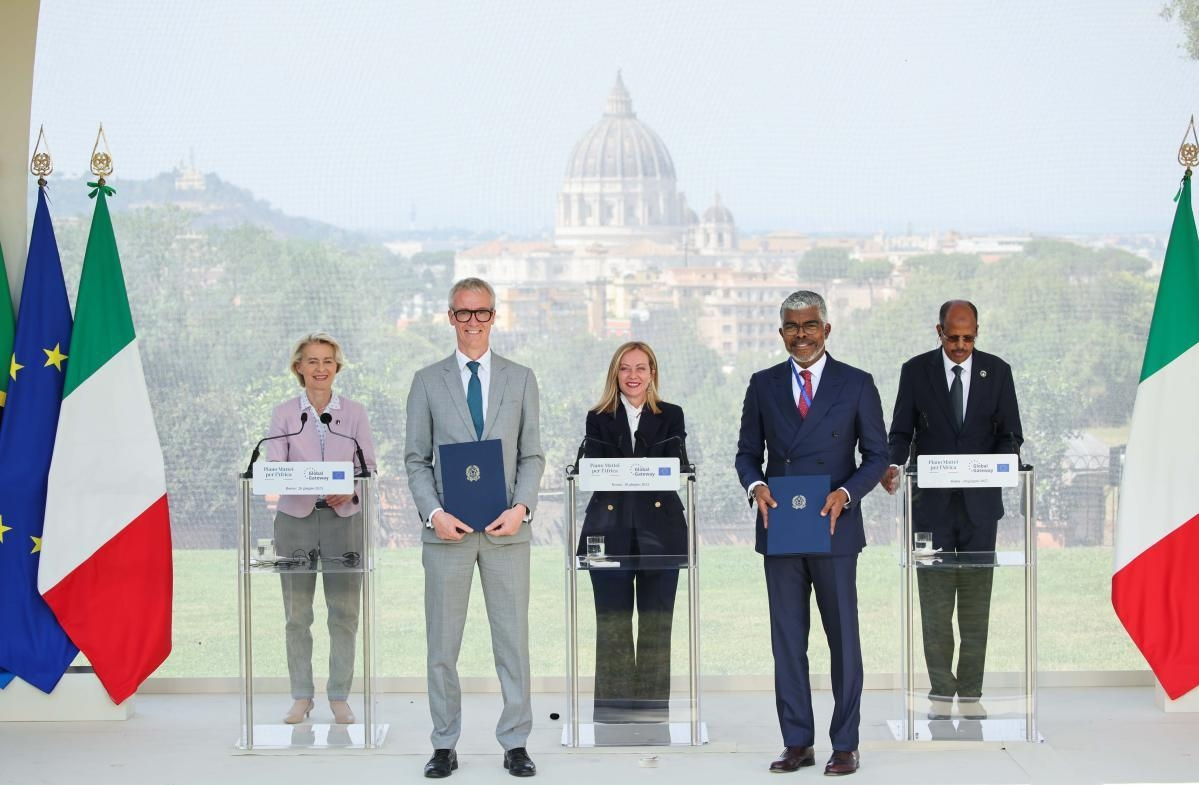
Doens standing between Ursula von der Leyen and Giorgia Meloni during a visit to Italy in 2025

He represented the European Commission at the signing of the Samoa Agreement, the successor to the Cotonou Agreement, in Apia on 15 November 2023, alongside Samoan Prime Minister Fiamē Naomi Mataʻafa and OACPS Secretary-General Georges Rebelo Pinto Chikoti.

Since 2025 Doens has led his department's contribution to the Commission's proposal for the 2028-2034 Multiannual Financial Framework, which would consolidate development, humanitarian, pre-accession and Ukraine assistance into a single Global Europe instrument worth some €200 billion. As Director-General he serves under Commissioner Jozef Síkela.

== Views ==
Doens has argued that the traditional donor-recipient framing of development cooperation no longer reflects a multipolar world in which countries such as India, Indonesia, Brazil and Kenya exercise substantial economic weight and that Western predominance was a historical exception rather than the norm. He described the 2021 renaming of his department as a deliberate signal of a change in mindset rather than a cosmetic exercise.

He maintains that official development assistance should function as a catalyst for public and private investment rather than as the principal source of financing, a position he has summarised by comparing aid to the oil in an engine rather than its fuel. He has also stated that European aid budgets are likely to keep contracting as governments prioritise competitiveness and defence spending.

Rejecting the argument that the EU has abandoned altruism for self-interest, Doens told the European Parliament Committee on Development in 2024 that spending aid as "a charity gift in partner countries" had rarely lifted countries out of poverty and that generosity and self-interest were not mutually exclusive. He has consistently denied that the Global Gateway was conceived as a response to China's Belt and Road Initiative, describing it instead as an agenda derived from the EU's own analysis of global conditions. On aid programming, he has criticised the dispersal of EU resources across too many countries and sectors, saying it sometimes amounted to spending "in homeopathic doses".

== Reception and criticism ==
Doens has been characterised in the specialist press as an influential but publicly low-profile figure within EU development policy.

The reorientation he has overseen has attracted sustained criticism. A 2024 report by Oxfam, Eurodad and Counter Balance argued that the Global Gateway primarily serves the commercial interests of European companies; Doens responded that the organisations were not neutral observers, that around 95 per cent of his department's expenditure must meet OECD criteria for official development assistance and that EU intervention is confined to activities the market will not finance on its own.

The 2025 OECD Development Assistance Committee peer review of the European Union raised concerns that the replacement of negotiated indicative programmes by Global Gateway initiatives risked weakening country ownership and alignment with partner priorities and questioned the strategy's applicability in fragile contexts. Analysts at ECDPM read the review as warning that the EU's self-described "paradigm shift" risked becoming a shift towards short-term commercial interest.

Development NGOs have also linked the shift to falling grant support for the poorest countries. CONCORD reported that EU institutions cut their official development assistance by 13.8 per cent in 2025, the largest such reduction in a decade and warned that the proposed Global Europe instrument risked marginalising ODA altogether.

Doens has publicly disputed reporting, based on leaked documents, that the EU intended to close the large majority of its overseas delegations, describing the claim as a misreading of an internal review of staffing and stating that the EU's field presence would be maintained.
