= Stabex =

The Stabex (from French Système de Stabilisation des Recettes d'Exportation) is the acronym for a European Commission compensatory finance scheme to stabilise export earnings of the ACP countries. It was first introduced in the first Lomé Convention (1975) with the purpose of remedying the harmful effects of the instability in export revenue from agricultural products.

Stabex (along with similar mechanism for the mineral products– Sysmin that was provided for in the second Lomé Convention (1979)) was abolished by Cotonou Agreement in 2000. The agreement has been linked closely to that of the IMF compensatory package. However the debate rages that these are not as effective as free trade due to the long run instability of the products.
