= Myriam Ferran =

European civil servant

Deputy Director-General of INTPA
- Incumbent
- Assumed office 1 November 2021 Serving with Marjeta Jager and Martin Seychell
- Commission: Von der Leyen I and II
- Director-General: Koen Doens

Personal details
- Citizenship: France
- Education: Institut national agronomique Paris Grignon; École nationale du génie rural, des eaux et des forêts Université libre de Bruxelles
- Occupation: European civil servant
- Profession: Engineer

Myriam Ferran is a European civil servant of French nationality who has served as Deputy Director-General of the Directorate-General for International Partnerships (DG INTPA) of the European Commission since November 2021. In that role she oversees the directorate-general's geographical directorates, covering Sub-Saharan Africa, Latin America and the Caribbean, and Asia and the Pacific.

Ferran began her career in the French public administration in 1992 and joined the European Commission in 2001, where she spent much of the following two decades working on enlargement policy before moving to international development.

== Education ==
Ferran trained as an agricultural engineer, graduating from the Institut national agronomique Paris-Grignon (INAPG) between 1988 and 1990. She subsequently qualified as an ingénieur du corps du génie rural, des eaux et des forêts (IGREF) at the École nationale du génie rural, des eaux et des forêts (ENGREF), completing the programme in December 1992.

In parallel, between September 1991 and July 1992 she took a licence spéciale en droit européen at the Institute for European Studies of the Université libre de Bruxelles. In February 2017 she completed the Leadership Decision Making Program at Harvard University's John F. Kennedy School of Government.

== Career ==
=== French public service (1992–2001) ===
Ferran entered the French civil service in December 1992 as an administrator responsible for food legislation at the Ministry of Agriculture, a post she held until September 1996. She then moved to the budget directorate of the Ministry of the Economy and Finance, where she covered agriculture from 1996 to 1998 and the European Union budget from 1998 to 1999.

From September 1999 to September 2001 she served as deputy head of cabinet to Dominique Voynet, then French Minister for the Environment.

=== European Commission: enlargement (2001–2017) ===
Ferran joined the European Commission in September 2001 as an administrator and Phare programming officer on the Estonia team of the Directorate-General for Enlargement (DG ELARG). She was assistant to the Director-General for Enlargement Policy from April 2004 to January 2006, and then assistant to the Deputy Director-General for Energy at the Directorate-General for Transport and Energy (DG TREN) until January 2007.

Between January 2007 and December 2009 she worked in the cabinet of Olli Rehn, the European Commissioner responsible for enlargement, serving as a member of cabinet and, from November 2008, as deputy head of cabinet.

She was appointed to her first head-of-unit post in December 2009, taking charge of relations with Iceland during that country's accession negotiations. She headed the Serbia unit from October 2010 to May 2015, and from May 2015 the unit responsible for negotiations with Turkey within the Directorate-General for Neighbourhood and Enlargement Negotiations (DG NEAR).

=== Director for Strategy and Turkey (2017–2021) ===
In October 2017 the Commission appointed Ferran Director for Strategy and Turkey at DG NEAR. The directorate combined responsibility for the Commission's overall neighbourhood and enlargement strategy with the Turkey file.

During her tenure she represented the Commission in bilateral contacts with Turkish authorities, including a meeting at the Turkish Directorate for EU Affairs with Deputy Minister of Foreign Affairs and Director for EU Affairs Ambassador Faruk Kaymakcı, at which the two discussed accelerating the Facility for Refugees in Turkey, the use of financial assistance under the Instrument for Pre-Accession Assistance and the wider Türkiye–EU agenda.

In March 2019 she gave a lecture at the Bologna Institute for Policy Research of Johns Hopkins University SAIS Europe, in a series on hard and soft power, arguing that enlargement policy illustrates the effectiveness of soft power. She characterised accession as a voluntary process in which applicant states undertake reforms measured against the Copenhagen criteria agreed in 1993, spanning political institutions, a functioning market economy and alignment with the acquis. Discussing the 2004 enlargement, she noted that the accession of ten states nearly doubled the Union's membership while complicating its decision-making and that enlargement was widely blamed after the French and Dutch referendums rejected the Constitution for Europe in 2005. She described the Western Balkans accession process as posing challenges of a different order, given post-conflict polarisation, corruption and organised crime and concluded that the process remains effective but depends on credibility and commitment from both sides.

=== Deputy Director-General for International Partnerships (2021–present) ===
On 20 July 2021 the College of Commissioners appointed Ferran Deputy Director-General of DG INTPA, with the effective date to be set subsequently. The Commission announced that she would take charge of the directorate-general's three geographical directorates - Africa; Latin America and the Caribbean together with relations with the overseas countries and territories; and the Middle East, Asia and the Pacific - coordinating some 2,500 staff at headquarters and in EU delegations. In announcing the appointment, the Commission cited her experience of enlargement policy and accession negotiations, her record of representing the institution at senior level and her management experience. She took up the post on 1 November 2021.

Ferran's move coincided with a shift in the Commission's framing of its development work, reflected in the renaming of the directorate-general from international cooperation and development to international partnerships.

==== Global Gateway and business forums ====
Much of Ferran's public activity in the role has involved the Global Gateway investment strategy. In March 2024 she attended the third Uganda-Europe Business Forum in Kampala, at which eight 'Team Europe' initiatives worth more than €200 million were launched, covering support for small businesses, women entrepreneurs, agribusiness and digital infrastructure alongside the European Investment Bank and several member states.

In July 2024 she unveiled the EU-Nigeria Agribusiness Platform at the ninth Nigeria-EU Business Forum in Abuja, a digital platform intended to link Nigerian and European agribusinesses and to attract private investment into the sector. She traced the initiative to commitments made at the EU-Nigeria Ministerial Dialogue of November 2020 and said it would be managed by a private-sector entity, Agribusiness Register Limited, with a focus on linkages between small and medium-sized enterprises on both sides.

In July 2025 Ferran visited Canberra as part of a mission to the Pacific, taking part in the seventh EU-Australia Development Dialogue at the Department of Foreign Affairs and Trade with Acting Deputy Secretary Jamie Isbister. The talks addressed cooperation on security, stability and prosperity in the Indo-Pacific. She also briefed European ambassadors on her regional engagements.

In January 2026 she attended the 27th Ministerial Roundtable of the Horn of Africa Initiative in Mogadishu, holding a bilateral meeting with Ethiopian Minister of Finance Ahmed Shide. According to the Ethiopian Ministry of Finance, the discussion covered the EU's commitment to finance an Ethiopia-Djibouti transport corridor under the initiative and increased support for macroeconomic reform programmes; the minister acknowledged EU backing for the Renewable, Integrated and Sustainable Energy and Digitalization (RISED) programme, delivered with the French Development Agency and the European Investment Bank.

She has also spoken on critical raw materials and raw materials partnerships, appearing at the EIT RawMaterials Summit and, in February 2026, on a panel at Mining Indaba in Cape Town concerning Italy–Africa cooperation on critical minerals.

==== Views on EU development policy ====
Returning to SAIS Europe in February 2025 for a lecture on the European Union and the Global South, Ferran set out how the Commission's approach had changed. She noted that the EU and its member states remain the largest providers of official development assistance worldwide, accounting for some 43 per cent of global funding, but argued that the Union suffers from a loss of visibility, with citizens in partner countries often perceiving China, Russia or Japan as the principal donors - a problem she said was compounded by the spread of misinformation.

She described a move away from unconditional assistance towards a more conditional approach, and greater engagement with the private sector on the grounds that public funding alone cannot meet investment needs; de-risking private investment, she argued, would stimulate foreign direct investment in line with the EU Competitiveness Compass and the Global Gateway strategy. She cited the Lobito Corridor linking Angola, the Democratic Republic of the Congo and Zambia to global markets as an example of the Union securing access to critical raw materials while pursuing development objectives. Asked about competition with China and the Gulf states, she encouraged a less competitive framing, noting that EU projects are frequently co-funded; on the dismantling of USAID, she said the Union could not fill the resulting gap for budgetary and political reasons, though it was examining options of last resort in the health and humanitarian fields.

== Languages ==
Ferran is a native French speaker and also works in English, Spanish and Italian.
