= The Courier (ACP-EU) =

Magazine financed by the European Development Fund

- Editor-in-Chief: Hegel Goutier
- Staff writers: Debra Percival, Marie-Martine Buckens
- Frequency: Bi-monthly
- Circulation: 80,000
- Publisher: European Commission
- First issue: July 2007 (n. 1-New Edition)
- Final issue: July 2011 n. 24
- Company: GOPA-Cartermill
- Country: Belgium
- Based in: Brussels
- Language: English, French, Spanish, Portuguese
- ISSN: 1784-682X

The Courier logo.

The Courier was an ACP-EU development magazine published by the Development Directorate General of the European Commission, focusing on ACP-EU Development Cooperation. Financed by the European Development Fund (EDF), it was published every two months, till it came to end in 2011. Its last edition was nr 24 covering months of July and August 2011. Its overall stated objective is to communicate, explain, promote and support the development objectives and principles of the Cotonou Agreement (art 5).

== History ==
The decision by the European Community and African countries to create a joint publication on development dates back to first Yaoundé Convention of 1963, linking the six countries of the recently formed European Community (Treaty of Rome, 1957) with 18 countries of the African Associated States and Madagascar, which foresaw boosting the capacity of African states in the field of information.

Originally entitled The ACP-EU Courier, the first issue of the magazine was published in 1970, but it was with the 1st Lomé Convention and the creation of the ACP Group in 1975 that that frequent publication took place.

The ACP-EU partnership was renewed in 2000 with the signing of the Cotonou Agreement, which was revised in 2005. According to article 5, the ACP-EU Courier had a role to increase understanding of the ACP-EU partnership's development policies. It also aimed to increase quality of information, awareness-raising and the sharing of experiences and good practices.

Production of the print publication was previously interrupted from December 2003 until July 2007. An interim electronic Courier (The e-Courier) was issued from June 2005 to January 2007. The magazine was then re-launched as The Courier, with its first edition in July 2007.

== Goals ==
In addition to its role as a complementary tool for the Cotonou framework, other stated aims are to raise awareness of ACP countries and to stimulate exchange of good practices and innovative approaches among ACP and EU actors. It is geared towards helping readers from ACP partner countries learn about each other and provides information about the ACP-EU cooperation model to other readers.

== Style ==
According to its website, the magazine is published in an “independent and self-critical” style, serving as “a tool for information, education and debate.” About 40% of the space is taken by the articles while 60% is reserved for illustrations and photographs.

== Audiences ==
The magazine addresses audiences worldwide but particularly those in ACP and EU countries. Specific target groups are state and non state actors, development organizations and decision makers, citizens, schools, women groups, media, libraries and documentation centers.

== Archive ==
The Courier is archived on http://ec.europa.eu/development/icenter/repository/ but external listing of this directory is not allowed. However, you can access the Courier directly: for example, to access Issue 181 in English use the link http://ec.europa.eu/development/icenter/repository/181_ACP_EU_en.pdf. The iCentre Search page seems to return results from the eCourier.

== See also ==
- List of magazines in Belgium
- ACP-EU Development Cooperation
- Directorate-General for Development (European Commission)
- ACP Countries
- Spore, magazine on ACP agriculture
