= Martin Seychell =

European civil servant

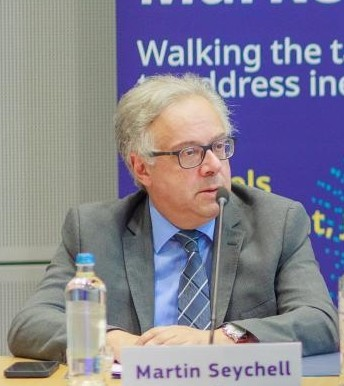
- Seychell in 2024

Deputy Director-General of INTPA
- Incumbent
- Assumed office 16 January 2021 Serving with Marjeta Jager and Myriam Ferran
- Commission: Von der Leyen I and II
- Director-General: Koen Doens

Personal details
- Citizenship: Malta
- Education: University of Malta
- Occupation: European civil servant
- Profession: Chemist

Martin Seychell is a European civil servant of Maltese nationality who has served as a Deputy Director-General of the Directorate-General for International Partnerships (DG INTPA) of the European Commission since January 2021, with responsibility for the directorates covering human development, migration, governance and peace, as well as for resources.

A graduate in chemistry and pharmaceutical technology, Seychell spent two decades in the Maltese public administration, working on standards, food safety, chemicals and environmental protection, before joining the European Commission in 2011 as Deputy Director-General for Health and Consumers. He held senior positions in the health portfolio until 2020, when he moved to international development.

== Education ==
Seychell holds a Bachelor of Pharmaceutical Technology with honours from the University of Malta, awarded at second class lower division. The four-year full-time course covered chemistry, biology, industrial chemistry, pharmaceutics and management.

== Career ==
=== Maltese public service (1986–2011) ===
Seychell began his career in February 1986 as a professional officer at the Malta Standards Laboratory, part of the Department of Industry, where he remained until November 1997. He then served as technical co-ordinator of the Malta Standards Authority from November 1997 to January 2001.

From January 2001 to October 2006 he headed the authority's Foodstuffs, Chemicals and Cosmetics Directorate, under the Ministry for Competitiveness and Communications. In that role he was responsible for implementing EU chemicals and cosmetics safety legislation in Malta under the Product Safety Act and for the adoption of EU rules on food labelling, additives, genetically modified organisms, novel foods and geographical indications. He also coordinated technical and legal advice to the ministry in developing Malta's national position on Commission legislative proposals in these areas. During the period leading to Malta's accession to the EU he took part in negotiations on major technical proposals, including new chemicals legislation and in screening exercises covering free movement of goods, environment and agriculture.

In October 2006 he became Director of Environment Protection at the Malta Environment and Planning Authority, a post he held until February 2011. His responsibilities covered implementation of the Environment Protection Act, environmental permitting and assessment, biodiversity, environmental risk including chemicals, noise, air quality and radiation, waste management and water and marine policy; between 2006 and 2009 he was also responsible for implementing climate change legislation. He served as the Maltese member of the Management Board of the European Environment Agency and represented the board in the shortlisting of its scientific committees and the review of its topic centres.

=== Other national and European roles ===
In 2008 Seychell represented Malta on the 'Sherpa' group convened by Commission President José Manuel Barroso to advise on policy towards genetically modified organisms. He represented Malta in the ad hoc Council working party on the REACH chemicals regulation between 2004 and 2006 and in the Council working party on the environment on proposals concerning mercury and soil. Between 2002 and 2004 he formed part of a task force set up by the European Cosmetics Association (COLIPA) to assist candidate countries in implementing the Cosmetic Products Directive.

=== Health and food safety (2011–2020) ===
Seychell was appointed Deputy Director-General of the Directorate-General for Health and Consumers (DG SANCO) in March 2011. The directorate-general was renamed Health and Food Safety (DG SANTE) on 1 January 2015. He was responsible for the directorates dealing with consumer affairs, public health and health systems and products, a portfolio spanning health security, pharmaceuticals, medical devices, tobacco control and digital health. Between 2011 and 2020 he also represented the Commission on the Management Board of the European Centre for Disease Prevention and Control.

Writing in the Commission's Health-EU newsletter in 2015 on the refugee crisis, Seychell argued that healthcare had to form part of the European response and that the needs of the most vulnerable arrivals had to be met. He described work through the EU Health Security Committee with transit and destination member states, including a checklist for assessing migrants' health at hotspots and reception areas intended to help reconstruct personal health records. He stressed that such measures existed to protect the health of refugees rather than in response to fears that they might spread infectious disease or burden health systems.

In a further newsletter editorial in 2016 he set out the Commission's approach to national health systems, framed around effectiveness, accessibility and resilience and their treatment within the European Semester. He noted that country-specific recommendations on health system reform had risen from eleven in 2015 to thirteen in 2016, with access to high-quality healthcare an explicit aim in six of them and linked the agenda to the emerging European Pillar of Social Rights.

Seychell took part in a Citizens' Dialogue at the EU House in Nicosia on 5 April 2019, discussing challenges facing the health sector with members of the public. The exchange covered prevention and early detection, cross-border implications and collective action on rare and serious diseases; he noted that early detection substantially improves the likelihood of recovery for many cancers and framed his attendance as an opportunity to hear what the EU "should do more, better, differently".

He was among the panellists at a Bruegel event in January 2020 on the state of health in the EU and the digitalisation of health promotion. In remarks to Euractiv, he characterised the European health sector as lagging other sectors in digitalisation by "up to a decade".

=== International partnerships (2020–present) ===
In July 2020 Seychell became a Deputy Director-General of the Directorate-General for International Cooperation and Development (DEVCO). When the directorate-general was reorganised and renamed International Partnerships, he was made responsible from 16 January 2021 for its Directorates G and R, covering human development, migration, governance & peace and resources respectively.

In February 2022, days ahead of the EU-Africa Summit, he joined a POLITICO panel with John Nkengasong of the Africa Centres for Disease Control and Prevention, the public health specialist Lieve Fransen and the pharmaceutical executive Stavros Nicolaou, on whether the global response to the COVID-19 pandemic warranted hope or disillusion. The discussion addressed inequities in access to vaccines, the shortcomings of the COVAX mechanism, manufacturing capacity and supply chains and the case for a pandemic treaty.

==== Global health and pandemic preparedness ====
In an interview published by the Commission's Health Emergency Preparedness and Response Authority (HERA) in October 2025, Seychell set out his thinking on global health. He argued that the importance of health should not be reduced to crisis prevention: economic growth matters to people only insofar as it improves daily life and a society that converts growth into longer and healthier lives is also more prosperous and productive. While accepting that global health cannot always rank first among competing priorities, he warned that historically a high price has been paid whenever it slips from view.

On manufacturing capacity, he identified dependence on imported medical products as a central lesson of the pandemic, noting that sub-Saharan Africa imports 99 per cent of its vaccines and more than 90 per cent of its medicines and medical commodities and that Latin America produced only a small share of its own COVID-19 vaccine supply. Export restrictions during the pandemic, he said, left countries without domestic capacity waiting and created a political difficulty for Europe in protecting its own population while partners could not do the same. He argued that every region requires a minimum manufacturing capacity for vaccines, diagnostics, therapeutics, pharmaceuticals and medical devices - not for self-sufficiency as such, but to reduce overdependence and support strategic autonomy - and that regional research and production also better match local epidemiological needs, citing Africa's demographic need for paediatric medicines and vaccines.

He described the EU's response through the MAV+ initiative on manufacturing and access to vaccines, medicines and health technologies, a flagship of the Global Gateway strategy, under which around €2 billion has been mobilised for manufacturing capacity and access in Africa using instruments including guarantees and blending. Complementary work covers the demand side, through support for purchasers such as Gavi and UNICEF to procure African-made products and the enabling environment of research, skills and regulation; he noted that regulators in Rwanda and Senegal had reached WHO maturity level 3 with EU support, alongside work to establish the African Medicines Agency and strengthen the Africa CDC. He also cited the Partnership to Accelerate Mpox Testing and Sequencing in Africa (PAMTA), launched with HERA and the Africa CDC.

On preparedness, Seychell characterised outbreaks as natural occurrences but pandemics as largely systemic failures, in which an outbreak grows unchecked until it becomes global. He pointed to the establishment of the Pandemic Fund, the adoption of the Pandemic Agreement and the creation of HERA as progress and identified surveillance networks, laboratories and data-sharing systems as priority investments, so that new pathogens can be detected early and the information linked directly to research and manufacturing. Tools such as genomic sequencing and artificial intelligence, he argued, are effective only within a strong framework of collaboration between laboratories.

== Languages ==
Seychell speaks Maltese and English as mother tongues, and also works in Italian and French.
