= Development Cooperation Instrument =

Financial instrument of the EU

Development Cooperation Instrument (2008–2013) covered three components:
1. Geographic programmers supporting co-operation with 47 developing countries in Latin America, Asia & Central Asia, the Gulf region and South Africa. 2. Thematic programmes benefiting all developing countries (including those covered by the European Development Fund 3. Programmes of accompanying measures for the 18 ACP Sugar Protocol countries, to help them adjust and following the reform of the EU sugar regime.

As of 2013 Development Cooperation Instrument was the second-largest financial instrument under Budget of the European Union's Heading 4 (Global Europe).

In 2005, the EU and its Member States agreed to achieve a collective level of ODA of 0.7% of GNI by 2015 and an interim target of 0.56% by 2010, with differentiated intermediate targets for those EU Member States which had recently joined the Union. On 23 May 2011, EU ministers responsible for development co-operation gathered to take stock of progress made and concluded that additional efforts would be needed to close an estimated gap of €50 billion to reach the collective EU target of 0.7% by 2015. The negotiations for the Budget of the European Union 2014–2020 were ongoing. On 29 June 2011, the European Commission presented the Communication 'A budget for Europe 2020' to the European Parliament, the council, the European Economic and Social Committee and the Committee of the Regions.

The amount for heading 4 (Global Europe) covering EU external action was in December 2011 further specified by the publication of proposals for a regulations for each of the specific instruments under heading 4. For the Development Cooperation Instrument, the proposed amount for the period 2014–2020 is €23,294.7 million.

In tough economic times, seven Member States (Austria, Czech Republic, Finland, Germany, the Netherlands, Sweden, and the United Kingdom) argued during 26 March General Affairs Council meeting that the European Commission's proposed overall amount for the Budget of the European Union should be reduced by €100 billion, or in the case of Sweden, by more than €100 billion. How this will influence the overall amount allocated for EU's development co-operation remains to be seen.

In 2021 it was merged into Global Europe.

== See also ==
- European Development Fund
- ACP-EU Development Cooperation
- ACP-EU Joint Parliamentary Assembly
