= ACP–EU Joint Parliamentary Assembly =

Assembly of representatives of countries that have signed the Cotonou Agreement

- APC member states
- Type: Inter-parliamentary institution
- Headquarters: Brussels, Belgium
- Website: https://www.europarl.europa.eu/acp/en/home

The ACP–EU Joint Parliamentary Assembly is an Inter-parliamentary institution created to bring together the elected representatives of the European Union (the Members of the European Parliament) and the elected representatives of the African, Caribbean and Pacific states ("ACP countries") that have signed the Cotonou Agreement.

Since the entry into force of the Treaty on European Union and EU enlargement it has acquired a more prominent role. A substantial part of the work of the JPA is directed towards promoting human rights and democracy and the common values of humanity, and this has produced joint commitments undertaken within the framework of the UN conferences.

== The Cotonou agreement ==
The following articles of the Cotonou Agreement relate to the Joint Parliamentary Assembly.

=== Article 14: The joint institutions ===
The institutions of this Agreement are the Council of Ministers, the Committee of Ambassadors and the Joint Parliamentary Assembly.

=== Article 17: The Joint Parliamentary Assembly ===
1. The Joint Parliamentary Assembly shall be composed of equal numbers of EU and ACP representatives. The members of the Joint Parliamentary Assembly shall be, on the one hand, members of the European Parliament and, on the other, members of parliament or, failing this, representatives designated by the parliament of each ACP State. In the absence of a parliament, the attendance of a representative from the ACP State concerned shall be subject to the prior approval of the Joint Parliamentary Assembly.

2. The role of the Joint Parliamentary Assembly, as a consultative body, shall be to:

- promote democratic processes through dialogue and consultation;
- facilitate greater understanding between the peoples of the European Union and those of the ACP :States and raise public awareness of development issues;
- discuss issues pertaining to development and the ACP-EU Partnership;
- adopt resolutions and make recommendations to the Council of Ministers with a view to achieving the objectives of this Agreement.

3. The Joint Parliamentary Assembly shall meet twice a year in plenary session, alternately in the European Union and in an ACP State. With a view to strengthening regional integration and fostering cooperation between national parliaments, meetings between EU and ACP members of parliament may be arranged at regional or subregional level.

The Joint Parliamentary Assembly shall organise regular contacts with representatives of the ACP-EU economic and social partners and the other actors of civil society in order to obtain their views on the attainment of the objectives of this Agreement.

4. The Joint Parliamentary Assembly shall adopt its rules of procedure within six months of the entry into force of this Agreement.

== Composition and working methods ==
The representatives of the 78 ACP states who, under the Cotonou Agreement, must be members of Parliament, meet their 78 European Parliament counterparts in plenary session for one week twice a year. The Joint Parliamentary Assembly (JPA) meets alternately in an ACP country and an EU country. The institution is governed by common, democratic rules.

Two co-presidents who are elected by the Assembly direct its work. Twenty-four vice-presidents (12 European and 12 ACP) who are also elected by the Assembly constitute the Bureau of the Joint Parliamentary Assembly, together with the two co-presidents. The Bureau meets several times a year in order to ensure the continuity of the work of the Joint Parliamentary Assembly and to prepare new initiatives aimed notably at reinforcing and improving cooperation. It also considers topical political questions and adopts positions on all human rights cases.

Three Standing Committees have been created in 2003 to draw up substantive proposals which are then voted on by the Joint Parliamentary Assembly. These Committees are:

- Committee on Political Affairs
- Committee on Economic Development, Finance and Trade
- Committee on Social Affairs and the Environment

The Assembly regularly forms exploratory or fact-finding missions. The members of the Joint Parliamentary Assembly are thus in direct contact with the situation on the ground in the various developing countries which are signatories of the Cotonou Agreement.

== Initiatives taken by the Joint Parliamentary Assembly ==
The Joint Parliamentary Assembly has made an active contribution towards implementing and reinforcing successive ACP-EU Conventions and has put forward numerous proposals:

- the upgrading of the role of women in the development process;
- the integration of environment policy in development projects;
- promotion of Trade as a tool for development, particularly by way of the Economic Partnership Agreements foreseen in the Cotonou Agreement;
- the drawing-up of rural development programmes and micro-projects tailored to the needs of specific communities;
- the improvement of measures aimed at combating epidemics and the reinforcement of health and hygiene services;
- the creation of decentralized development policies;
- the convening of annual meetings between economic and social partners;
- the promotion of regional, political and commercial cooperation;
- closer cooperation with non-governmental organisations engaged in development;
- aid for indebted countries pursuing structural adjustment policies to allow them to maintain indispensable services;
- measures to enhance the cultural dimension in North-South cooperation;
- the acceleration of aid procedures and the increase in appropriations intended for refugees and for displaced persons (the latter is a new departure);
- measures to reinforce the commitment to respect and defend human rights and human dignity.

== The Co-Presidents ==
- EU co-president: Carlos Zorrinho, Portugal
- ACP co-president: Peter Kenilorea Jr., Solomon Islands

== EU members of the assembly ==
The EU members are all members of the European Parliament.

== Meetings of the Joint Parliamentary Assembly ==
- 40th Session, Brussels/ remote and reduced due to COVID-19 pandemic, 17 and 24 June 2021
- 39th Session, Brussels/ remote and reduced due to COVID-19 pandemic, 3 and 10 December 2020
- 38th Session, Kigali (Rwanda), 17–21 November 2019
- 37th Session, Bucharest (Romania), 18–20 March 2019
- 36th Session, Cotonou (Benin), 3–5 December 2018
- 35th Session, Brussels (Belgium), 18–20 June 2018
- 34th Session, Port-au-Prince (Haiti), 18–20 December 2017
- 33rd Session, St. Julian's (Malta), 19–21 June 2017
- 32nd Session, Nairobi (Kenya), 19–21 December 2016
- 31st Session, Windhoek (Namibia), 13–15 June 2016
- 30th Session, Brussels (Belgium), 7–9 December 2015
- 29th Session, Suva (Fiji), 15–17 June 2015
- 28th Session, Strasbourg (France), 1–3 December 2014
- 27th Session, Strasbourg (France). 17–19 March 2014
- 26th Session, Addis Ababa (Ethiopia), 23–27 November 2013
- 25th Session, Brussels (Belgium), 15–19 June 2013
- 24th Session, Paramaribo (Suriname), 25–29 November 2012
- 23rd Session, Horsens (Denmark), 26–30 May 2012
- 22nd Session, Lome (Togo), 19–23 November 2011
- 21st Session, Budapest (Hungary), 14–18 May 2011
- 20th Session, Kinshasa (Republic of Congo), 30 Nov - 4 Dec 2010
- 19th Session, Tenerife (Spain), 27 March - 1 April 2010
- 18th Session, Luanda (Angola), 30 November - 3 December 2009
- 17th Session, Prague (Czech Republic), 4–9 April 2009
- 16th Session, Port Moresby (Papua New Guinea, 24–28 November 2008
- 15th Session, Ljubljana (Slovenia), 15–20 March 2008
- 14th Session, Kigali (Rwanda), 17–22 November 2007
- 13th Session, Wiesbaden (Germany), 23–28 June 2007
- 12th Session, Bridgetown (Barbados), 18–23 November 2006
- 11th Session, Vienna (Austria), 17–22 June 2006
- 10th Session, Edinburgh (United Kingdom), 19–24 November 2005
- 9th Session, Bamako (Mali), 16–20 April 2005
- 8th Session, The Hague (The Netherlands), 20–25 November 2004
- 7th Session, Addis Ababa (Ethiopia), 16–19 February 2004
- 6th Session, Rome, 11–15 October 2003
- 5th Session, Brazzaville, 31 March-3 April 2003
- 5th Session, Brussels, 25–28 November 2002 (CANCELLED)
- 4th Session, Cape Town, 18–21 March 2002
- 3rd Session, Brussels, 29 October-1 November 2001 (OJ C 78, 2/4/2002)
- 2nd Session, Libreville, 19–22 March 2001 (OJ C 265, 20/9/2001)
- 1st Session, Brussels, 9–12 October 2000 (OJ C 64, 28/2/2001)

== See also ==
- European Development Fund
- ACP-EU Development Cooperation
- Foreign relations of the European Union
- The Courier (ACP-EU) : The magazine of Africa-Caribbean-Pacific and European Union cooperation and relations
- Euronest Parliamentary Assembly
- Euro-Latin American Parliamentary Assembly
