= Non-state actor =

Influential individual or group independent of state governments

A non-state actor (NSA) is an individual or organization that has significant political influence but is not allied to any particular country or state.

The interests, structure, and influence of NSAs vary widely. For example, among NSAs are non-profit organizations, labor unions, non-governmental organizations, banks, corporations, media organizations, business magnates, people's liberation movements, lobby groups, religious groups, aid agencies, and violent non-state actors such as paramilitary forces.

== Types ==
Some common and influential classes of NSAs are listed here in alphabetical order:

- Business magnates are individuals who command large wealth, and who often seek to influence national and international affairs. Examples are Warren Buffett and Elon Musk.
- Corporations, which include multinational corporations (MNCs), are companies authorized to act as single entities (legally as persons) and are recognized as such in law. They include very large businesses operating transnationally, such as The Coca-Cola Company, McDonald's, General Motors, Adidas, Huawei, Renault, Samsung, Nestlé and Toyota.
- Decentralized autonomous organizations (DAOs), sometimes known as decentralized autonomous corporations (DACs), operate according to rules encoded as computer programs called smart contracts. The crypto-currency Bitcoin is an example of a DAO which has grown to become economically influential.
- International media agencies, which are also usually corporations, report on the social and political situation in countries worldwide, and may therefore be highly influential as NSAs. Examples of such agencies are AFP, EFE, CNN, MSNBC, Reuters, AP, RIA Novosti and Xinhua.
- Non-governmental organizations (NGOs), which include international non-governmental organizations (INGOs), are usually nonprofit organizations seeking to effect change in humanitarian, educational, ecological, healthcare, public policy, social, human rights, environmental, and other areas. Examples of NGOs are Greenpeace, Red Cross/Red Crescent, Amnesty International, Human Rights Watch and WWF. Goodwill ambassadors or humanitarian aid workers involved with INGO missions abroad may also be considered as non-state actors.
- People's movements are mass movements which become influential with size and longevity. Examples include the movements arising during the Arab Spring of 2011.
- Religious groups commonly engage in political affairs at an international level. For example, the Quakers, as a historic peace church, operate offices at the United Nations. Another example is the Taliban, which is a religious group as well as a violent non-state actor.
- Transnational diaspora communities are ethnic or national communities that commonly seek to bring social and political change to their originating countries and their adoptive countries. The Israeli diaspora is an example.
- Unincorporated associations, secret societies and civic organizations unknown to or unrecognized by the state or government may be considered non-state actors.
- Unrepresented nations and peoples include many indigenous peoples and Fourth World societies.
- Violent non-state actors (VNSAs) are armed groups, including groups such as ISIS or criminal organizations, for example drug cartels.
- World citizens may be considered non-state actors if they are active in movements or social causes active outside their own country.

== Effects on the Westphalian state model ==
The proliferation of non-state actors since the Cold War ended has been one of the factors leading to the Cobweb Paradigm in international politics. Under this paradigm, the traditional Westphalian nation-state experiences an erosion of power and sovereignty, and non-state actors are part of the cause. Facilitated by globalization, NSAs challenge nation-state borders and sovereignty claims. MNCs are not always sympathetic to national interests but are loyal to the corporation's interests instead. NSAs challenge the nation-state's sovereignty over internal matters through advocacy for societal issues, such as human rights and the environment.

Armed non-state actors operate without state control and are involved in internal and trans-border conflicts. The activity of such groups in armed conflicts adds layers of complexity to traditional conflict management and resolution. The conflicts are often fought not only between non-state actors and states but also between multiple NSA groups. Interventions in such conflicts is particularly challenging since international law and the norms governing the use of force for intervention or peacekeeping purposes were written primarily in the context of the nation-state.

Following the September 11 attacks, the United States and a number of other states argued that the right of self-defence under Article 51 of the United Nations Charter could be invoked in response to attacks carried out by non-state actors such as Al-Qaeda. United Nations Security Council resolutions adopted after the attacks were widely interpreted as recognizing the United States’ right of self-defence, although states and scholars have differed on the extent to which those resolutions clarified or modified existing international law regarding attacks by non-state actors.

The applicability of Article 51 to attacks conducted by non-state actors remains the subject of continuing debate. In particular, controversy persists regarding the circumstances in which force may lawfully be used against such groups when they operate from the territory of another sovereign state. Likewise, the legality of anticipatory or pre-emptive self-defence against an imminent threat is not universally accepted and remains contested in international legal scholarship and state practice.

At the same time, non-state actors are increasingly regarded as capable of bearing certain obligations under international law, particularly under international humanitarian law and international criminal law. The international response to the 9/11 attacks contributed to the development of legal and political debates concerning the role, responsibilities, and accountability of non-state actors in armed conflict and international security.

More recently, some states have advanced broader interpretations of the law of armed conflict in relation to non-state actors. For example, in a notification to the United States Congress in 2025, the administration of President Donald Trump stated that the United States was engaged in a “non-international armed conflict” with certain drug cartels, characterizing cartel members as “unlawful combatants” and asserting that their activities constituted an armed attack against the United States. Legal experts and commentators have disputed whether such characterizations are supported by existing international law, illustrating the continuing controversy surrounding the status of non-state actors and the scope of self-defence against them.

== Example: Cotonou Agreement ==
The term Non State Actors is widely used in development cooperation, particularly under the Cotonou Agreement between the European Union (EU) and African, Caribbean and Pacific ACP countries. The agreement uses the term to refer to a wide range of nongovernmental development actors whose participation in ACP-EU development cooperation is now formally recognized. According to Article 6, non-state actors include:

- civil society in all its diversity, according to national characteristics;
- economic and social partners, including trade union organisations and;
- the private sector.

In practice, it means that participation is open to all kind of actors, such as community-based organisations, women's groups, human rights associations, non-governmental organisations (NGOs), religious organizations, farmers' cooperatives, trade unions, universities and research institutes, the media and the private sector. Also included in this definition are informal groups such as grassroots organizations, informal private sector associations, etc. The private sector, however, is considered only insofar as it is involved in non-profit activities (e.g. private sector associations, chambers of commerce, etc.)

== Roles ==
Non-state actors can aid in opinion building in international affairs, such as the Human Rights Council. Formal international organizations may also rely on non-state actors, particularly NGOs in the form of implementing partners in the national context. An example is the contribution of COHRE (Centre on Housing Rights and Evictions), to the protection of land and property (HLP) rights in Kosovo by conceptualizing the Housing and Property Directorate (now Kosovo Property Agency) within the framework of the United Nations Interim Administration Mission in Kosovo.

Non-state actors are fundamental agents in helping to achieve both national and international development goals, such as those around climate change. Actions by non-state actors contribute significantly towards filling the greenhouse gas emissions gap left by unambitious or poorly executed national climate policies, Intended Nationally Determined Contributions (INDCs).

Another example that shows the importance of non-state actors in peace-building is the contribution of ICBL (International Campaign to Ban Landmines) to the international prohibition on the use of landmines. ICBL is a global network of NGOs that has operated in over 90 countries since 1992. Its primary goal is to make a world free of anti-personnel landmines. Their passionate advertising appealing for global cooperation drew Diana, Princess of Wales to become an ardent advocate. Together, they brought the issue to the United Nations General Assembly. ICBL's efforts led the international community to urge states to ratify the Ottawa Treaty (Mine Ban Treaty) in 1997, and its contribution was recognized and praised as it was awarded the Nobel Peace Prize in the same year.

Non-state actors also have a role in governance. While NSAs are incredibly useful in advancing international peace, monitoring human rights violations, and lobbying for socio-political issues like climate change, they also play a role in non-traditional governance. Many fragile states rely on non-state actors for protection and administration. More traditional methods of governance include local courts and clans, on the other end, non-traditional NSA groups govern as paramilitaries or rebel groups. The importance of this is that in the last 20 years non-state actors have acquired legal recognition due to their heavy involvement in the international order. Their growing presence as an alternative governmental presence also holds them accountable to international law.

== See also ==
- Civil society
- Transnationalism
