= Patrick Develtere =

Belgian social scientist

Patrick Develtere (born August 26, 1961 in Roeselare, Belgium) is professor at the Faculty of Social Sciences of the University of Leuven (KU Leuven). From 2017 until the beginning of 2020 he was a principal adviser for European Social Policy at the European Political Strategy Centre (EPSC), the in-house think tank of the European Commission. Before joining the EPSC in 2017 he was the president of beweging.net, (formerly ACW) the Belgian Christian Workers’ movement.

== Biography ==
Patrick Develtere got his PhD in Social Sciences in 1994 at the Katholieke Universiteit Leuven (KU Leuven) with his thesis Co-operation and Development. Develtere teaches international development co-operation at the Faculty of Social Sciences at the University of Leuven. From 2010 until 2017 he was the president of ACW, now Beweging.net. Beweging.net, also known as the Christian Workers' Movement. Prior to this he was the director of the Research Institute for Work and Society (HIVA). This institute is a partnership between the University of Leuven and Beweging.net. He has also been secretary general of Wereldsolidariteit, the NGO of beweging.net. During many years he was the editor in chief of the Gids op Maatschappelijk Gebied, the monthly magazine of beweging.net.

From 1987 till 1990 he was an associate expert with the International Labour Organization (ILO). He worked for the ILO regional office in Port of Spain (Trinidad and Tobago) and to the liaison office of the ILO with the European Commission in Brussels.

== Publications ==
- Develtere, P.; Huyse, H.; Van Ongevalle, J. (2021). International Development Cooperation Today: a radical shift towards a global paradigm. Leuven University Press. ISBN 9789462702615
- A Whole-of-Society Approach for a new Africa-Europe Alliance - Develtere P., Capacity4dev, November 2019
- Letter from Belgium - Develtere P., Great insights magazine, European Centre for Development Policy Management, Spring/Summer 2019
- A Plea for Qualitative Growth: Qualityis better than more - Develtere P., De gids op maatschappelijk gebied, April 2016
- Develtere, P.; Huyse, H.; Van Ongevalle, J. (2012). How do we help? The Free Market in Development Aid. Universitaire Pers Leuven. ISBN 9789058679024.
- Zhao, L.; Develtere, P. (2010). "New co-operatives in China: why they break away from orthodox co-operatives?". Social Enterprise Journal. 6 (1): 35–48. doi:10.1108/17508611011043048.
- Defourny, J.; Develtere, P.; Fonteneau, B.; Nyssens, M. (2009). The Worldwide Making of the Social Economy. Innovations and Changes. Leuven: Acco. ISBN 9789033475979.
- Peels, R.; Develtere, P. (2009). "Civil Society Involvement in International Development Cooperation: In Search for Data". Social Indicators Research. 93 (2): 331–334. doi:10.1007/s11205-008-9320-x. S2CID 154945342.
- Develtere, P.; Pollet, I.; Wanyama, F. (2009). Cooperating out of Poverty - The Renaissance of the African cooperative movement. Geneva: International Labour Office. ISBN 9789221207221.
- Develtere, P.; Huybrechts, A. (Spring 2008). "The movement for the Abolition of Child Labour: Example of a Transnational Network Movement". Work Organisation, Labour & Globalisation. 2 (1): 165–179. doi:10.13169/workorgalaboglob.2.1.0165.
- Develtere, P.; Huybrechts, A. (April 2005). "The impact of microcredit on the poor in Bangladesh". Alternatives. 30 (2): 165–189. doi:10.1177/030437540503000203. S2CID 145627300.

== Sources ==
- EPSC website
