= Pacific Island Farmers Organisation Network =

The Pacific Island Farmers Organisation Network (PIFON) serves as an umbrella organisation for national farmer organizations in the Pacific island region. It is based in Nadi, Fiji and has membership of organisations from the Cook Islands, Fiji, Tonga, Samoa, Solomon Islands and Vanuatu, as well as a Melanesian regional organisation. Although operating informally since 2009, its first formal foundation meeting was held in April 2013 in Nadi, when 13 organisations were represented and PIFON became operational as a legal entity in its own right.

== Purpose ==
PIFON was established to provide support to the small national farmer organisations in the region through coordinating capacity building, sharing success stories, and supporting regional exchanges of expertise, thus potentially enabling smallholder farmers to play an important role in agricultural value chains. The founder members noted that while farmer organisations had in the past depended on a high level of donor support, this support had often been sporadic. Moreover, because of their limited resources the organisations had been unable to clearly articulate their needs. It was therefore considered important to develop business activities to promote farmer organisation sustainability, while not detracting from their core values and objectives.

== Activities and support ==
PIFON carries out three broad types of activities: to enhance sustainability of national members; to provide practical information to enable farmers to carry out income-generating activities; and to support members in promoting sustainable production practices. Within the Pacific region it has identified opportunities for farmers to supply growing urban and tourism markets, expand tree crop exports, and exploit niche product exports based on fairtrade and organic certification.

Since its establishment PIFON has received support from International Fund for Agricultural Development (IFAD), the European Commission and Technical Centre for Agricultural and Rural Cooperation ACP-EU (CTA). It has also signed a partnership agreement with the Pacific Community (SPC).

== See also ==
- Pacific Islands Private Sector Organisation (PIPSO)
