= Lomé Agreement =

Lomé Agreement may refer to:

- The Lomé Convention
- An agreement in the First Liberian Civil War
