= Baku Initiative =

International initiative of the EU

The Baku Initiative is an international initiative of the European Union. It is a policy dialogue on energy and transport cooperation between the European Union, Turkey, and the former Soviet republics, undertaken as part of the INOGATE energy and TRACECA transport programmes.

== History ==
The Baku Initiative originated from the European Neighbourhood Policy launched in 2004. On 13 November 2004, the First Ministerial Conference on Energy Cooperation between the EU and the littoral states of the Black Sea, Caspian Sea and their neighbours was held in Baku. Conclusions of this conference became known as the Baku Initiative. At the same time, a Transport Ministerial conference was held, resulting in a formal announcement on 14 November, supporting the framework of the EU TRACECA programme. A second Ministerial Conference following up the Energy Initiative was held in Astana, Kazakhstan on 30 November 2006. A second Transport Ministerial Conference was held in Sofia, Bulgaria on 2–3 May 2006.

== Objectives ==
=== Energy ===
The Initiative aims to enhance integration of the energy markets of participating countries with the EU energy market so as to create transparent energy markets, capable of attracting investment as well as enhancing security of energy supply. Some authors describe this aim as European funding and investment for infrastructure development in return for a guarantee of supplies to European markets.

The objectives of the initiative are harmonisation of legal and technical standards to create a functioning integrated energy market in accordance with EU and international legal and regulatory frameworks; increasing the safety and security of energy supplies by extending and modernising existing infrastructure; substituting old and inefficient power generation infrastructures with environmentally friendly power generation infrastructures; developing new infrastructures and implementing a modern monitoring system of their operation; improvement of energy supply and demand management through the integration of efficient and sustainable energy systems; and promoting the financing of commercially and environmentally viable energy projects of common interest. A road map to achieve these objectives was adopted at the Astana Ministerial Conference. The road map lists the following priorities:

- Enhancing energy security addressing demand, supply and transit;
- Supporting sustainable energy development;
- Attracting investment;
- Converging of energy markets on the basis of EU internal energy market principles.

These activities were financed through the European Bank for Reconstruction and Development and the European Investment Bank.

=== Transport ===
According to the EU Transport Directorate, "The Baku Initiative aims to give an impulse to Trans-European transport cooperation on the basis of the mutual interest for the progressive integration of their respective transport networks and markets in accordance with EU and international legal and regulatory frameworks. It provides a supportive framework for TRACECA to foster the reflection on the cooperation between the EU-Black Sea/Caspian littoral States and their Neighbours, and to ensure the consistency with the EU priorities in the context of its Neighbourhood Policy.

Following the conclusions reached at the EU-Caspian region Transport Ministerial Conference on 14 November 2004 in Baku, 4 expert working groups have been created (aviation, security in all modes of transport, road and rail transport, transport infrastructure)."

Following the Sofia meeting in 2006, a fifth working group was added, dealing with maritime transport.

== Partner countries of the Baku Initiative ==
The partner countries of the transport and energy aspects and issues of the Baku Initiative are listed below. Aside from Bulgaria, Romania, and Turkey, the members are the former republics of the Soviet Union:

- Armenia
- Azerbaijan
- Belarus
- Bulgaria
- Georgia
- Kazakhstan
- Kyrgyzstan
- Moldova
- Romania
- Russia (observer status only)
- Tajikistan
- Turkey
- Turkmenistan
- Ukraine
- Uzbekistan

== Structure ==
The European Union follows the progress of the Baku Initiative through the European Commission (Directorate General for Transport & Energy; Directorate General for External Relations, and EuropeAid Cooperation Office). The INOGATE Technical Secretariat (which is located in Kyiv, with a regional office in Tbilisi covering the Caucasus) co-ordinates the energy aspects on behalf of the Commission and the TRACECA Secretariat, (which is located in Baku with a regional office in Odesa) performs the same function for the transport aspects.

== Critics ==
Frank Umbach of the Centre for European Security Strategies, has criticised the Baku Initiative and other policies towards the Caspian region for concentrating too much on the technical cooperation instead of seeking a more strategic long-term cooperation.

== See also ==
- INOGATE
- TRACECA
- Energy policy of the European Union
- Transport in the European Union
