= Spokespersons' Service (European Commission) =

Press service of the European Commission

The Spokespersons' Service (SPP; French: Service du porte-parole) is the press service of the European Commission. It is the commission's official voice towards the media, organising press conferences and briefings and acting as the principal point of contact for news organisations covering the institution. It is best known for the daily midday briefing, an on-camera question-and-answer session held in the press room of the Berlaymont building in Brussels.

Administratively the service forms part of the Commission's Directorate-General for Communication (DG COMM), where it is designated COMM.SPP. Unlike the rest of the directorate-general, it operates under the direct political authority of the President of the European Commission and is responsible for coordinating and delivering the commission's media strategy and political communication. Since December 2024 the Chief Spokesperson has been Paula Pinho.

== Role and organisation ==
=== Chief spokesperson ===
The chief spokesperson heads the service and is the commission's most senior communications official after the director-general for communication. The post is filled by political appointment by the commission president rather than by ordinary competition, and the holder works closely with the president's cabinet. The chief spokesperson is supported by deputy chief spokespersons and, under the second von der Leyen Commission, by an executive communication adviser responsible for longer-term strategic communication and the coherence of the commission's political messaging.

=== Spokespersons and press officers ===
Below the leadership tier sits a body of thematic spokespersons, each responsible for one or more policy areas - for example trade and economic security, foreign affairs and security policy, competition, climate and energy or justice and the rule of law. Portfolios are aligned with those of individual Commissioners, but spokespersons answer through the service rather than independently of it, which is the principal mechanism by which the commission maintains a single line across a college of twenty-seven members.

Spokespersons are assisted by press officers and press assistants covering the same subject areas, and the service also contains a planning and coordination team, a media accreditation function, the president's media and social media team, speechwriters and staff producing photographic and video material.

== Midday briefing ==
The service holds a briefing for accredited journalists each working day at around midday, historically known in French as the rendez-vous de midi. The Chief Spokesperson or a deputy opens with announcements arising from the commission's business, after which spokespersons take questions on their portfolios from the floor. The briefing is carried live on the commission's audiovisual service and archived and a written summary is circulated as the Midday Express (EXME) through the commission's press corner.

The format is a distinctive feature of the Brussels institutional landscape: no other EU institution holds a comparable daily on-camera session and the briefing functions in practice as the main routine forum in which the commission is questioned publicly outside the European Parliament.

== Press room and accreditation ==
The service operates the commission's press zone in the Berlaymont building at Rue de la Loi 200, which comprises the main press room, an area for press points, a media working area and a press bar. Access is governed by media accreditation issued by the commission and by a code of conduct for journalists on commission premises.

== Chief spokespersons ==
Name	Term	Commission
Johannes Laitenberger	2005-2009	Barroso I
Pia Ahrenkilde Hansen	2009-2014	Barroso II
Margaritis Schinas	2014-2019	Juncker
Eric Mamer	2019-2024	Von der Leyen I
Paula Pinho	2024-present	Von der Leyen II

== Analysis ==
Commentators have noted a structural tension in the service's position. Its members are European civil servants bound by the Staff Regulations, yet the service answers politically to the Commission President and its output is expected to defend positions taken by the college. The daily briefing has correspondingly been characterised both as an unusual standing commitment to public accountability and as an exercise in message discipline, in which spokespersons decline to go beyond agreed lines on contested files.

== See also ==
- Directorate-General for Communication
- Media freedom in the European Union
- Press secretary
