= Web 2.0 for development =

Participatory Web 2.0 for development (in short Web2forDev) was a term coined around 2007–2008 to describe new ways of employing legemvweb services, in order to improve information sharing and collaborative production of content in the context of development work. Emerging developments in participatory Web and user-generated content platforms were seen to create conditions by which actors in development could easily relate to other stakeholders, have selective access to information, produce and publish their own content and redistribute pieces of content released by others. At this time, new social tools, such as wikis, blogs, and other user-generated content platforms, were first being considered for their ability to help development actors integrate, combine, aggregate, generate, moderate and mediate content. In a typical Web2forDev scenario data and/or functionalities from a number of free/low cost online applications are combined and served as mashups thus ensuring a wide range of online services at low cost. The term is no longer used in the development informatics or ICT4D fields.

== History ==
Web2forDev was first used as a term at the Web2forDev International Conference organised by CTA and other development partners in Rome at FAO in September 2007. The event was organised by The Association for Progressive Communications, The ACP Secretariat, Consultative Group on International Agricultural Research, Technical Centre for Agricultural and Rural Cooperation (CTA) ACP-EU, Euforic, Food and Agriculture Organization of the United Nations, Deutsche Gesellschaft für Technische Zusammenarbeit GmbH, International Fund for Agricultural Development, International Institute for Communication and Development (IICD), University of British Columbia and Université Cheikh Anta DIOP.

== Technology overview ==
Open source and proprietary, free or low-cost interactive user centered applications that promote communication, online collaboration, sharing information, user empowerment, and social networking. Considering the constraints which affect many developing countries, Web2forDev applications are usually low-bandwidth friendly. There's a revolution that is vitally transforming the way business and enterprise utilize the Web. Something like an enormous software upgrade for the entire Web and it's called Web 2.0. The web is shifting from just being an intermediate in which information is transmitted and consumed, into being a platform in which content is shaped, shared, remixed, repurposed, and passed along. Various companies have started understanding that the social side of change, including personal networks and developing trusting relationships, might prove to be the most powerful strategy for promotion. The new Web 2.0 Business ground rules include an increasing focus on knowledge, trust, relationships, and communities which in many senses is the true structure of today's organization. Web 2.0 applications are changing the way the world communicates allowing consumers to share opinions, wants, needs and motivations.

== Usage ==
Web 2.0 applications are used in the development sector for a number of purposes and by different actors. Examples are ...

- Internet/SMS gateways are being used to distribute development-related information to people with access to mobile phones but without access to internet. Similarly, these gateways enable mobile phone users to make their presence on the internet by posting to blogs and online databases via sms, etc.
- Tagging systems and content aggregation enable users with access to only low-bandwidth to find quickly the information they are searching for, without having to navigate through many bandwidth-demanding websites.
- Users with old computers can take advantage of some online applications which can process their computing tasks the way their computers never could (e.g. online version of Adobe Photoshop)
- Users who don't own their own PCs are using online services to store all their data, such as emails, documents, photos, etc., thus having access to them from any computer connected to internet. That way, online storage spaces and related services substitute physical hard drive spaces (PCs) which in many regions are shared by many users.

== Works ==
- The Machine is Us/ing Us Educational video by prof Michael Wesch, Kansas State University

== See also ==
- Kabissa - Space For Change in Africa
- Technical Centre for Agricultural and Rural Cooperation ACP-EU (CTA)
- The International Institute for Communication and Development (IICD)
- Web 2.0
