= Caribbean Farmers Network =

Regional farmers' organization for the English-speaking Caribbean

The Caribbean Farmers Network (CaFAN) was formed in 2004 following exploratory discussions amongst farmer organizations in 2002. It is a regional network of Farmers' Associations and Non-governmental organizations in the Caribbean, with its headquarters in Saint Vincent and the Grenadines. Members of CaFAN presently consist of farmer associations from Antigua and Barbuda, Barbados, Bahamas, Belize, Dominica, Grenada, Guyana, Jamaica, St Kitts/Nevis; St Lucia, Saint Vincent and the Grenadines, Trinidad and Tobago and Suriname.

CaFAN's major focus is to support training for and information sharing amongst Caribbean farmers. It organises training workshops, study tours and other information sharing. It produces a regular newsletter and supports a weekly radio programme that is broadcast to the region’s farmers online. It has been active in mobilising resources from a variety of donor organizations including:

- The Caribbean Community (CARICOM)
- The Canadian International Development Agency (CIDA)
- The Europe-Africa-Caribbean-Pacific Liaison Committee (COLEACP)
- Food and Agriculture Organization of the United Nations (FAO-UN)
- Oxfam GB
- Technical Centre for Agricultural and Rural Cooperation ACP-EU (CTA)
