= Technical Assistance to the Commonwealth of Independent States =

Foreign and technical assistance programme

Technical Assistance to the Commonwealth of Independent States (TACIS) was a foreign aid and technical assistance programme implemented by the European Commission to help members of the Commonwealth of Independent States (as well as Mongolia), in their transition to democratic market-oriented economies. TACIS is now subsumed in the Global Europe programme.

== History ==
Launched by the European Economic Community in 1991, the Tacis Programme provides grant-financed technical assistance to 12 countries of Eastern Europe and Central Asia (Armenia, Azerbaijan, Belarus, Georgia, Kazakhstan, Kyrgyzstan, Moldova, Russia, Tajikistan, Turkmenistan, Ukraine and Uzbekistan). Mongolia was also covered by the Tacis programme from 1991 to 2003, but is now covered by the ALA Programme.

From the 2007-2013 EU Financial Perspective, the Tacis Programme has been replaced for the countries of the European Neighbourhood Policy and Russia by the European Neighbourhood and Partnership Instrument. Nuclear safety projects are covered by the Instrument for Nuclear Safety Cooperation. However, Tacis projects programmed from 2006 continued to operate until 2012.

== See also ==
- Economy of Europe
- Foreign relations of the European Union
