= Southern African Confederation of Agricultural Unions =

Umbrella organization representing farmer unions in the SADC region

The Southern African Confederation of Agricultural Unions (SACAU) is a not-for-profit farmer organization representing national agricultural unions in the Southern African Development Community (SADC) region. SACAU was formed in 1992 by six farmer organizations but has since expanded its membership to include 17 farmer organisations in 12 countries. In addition, there are associate members, including regional commodity organizations and private companies associated with agricultural value chains on a regional basis. SACAU's headquarters are in Centurion, Republic of South Africa.

SACAU aims to be the main voice of farmers within the region and to promote effective producers’ organizations in all regional countries. Its mandate is to foster understanding between farmers’ organisations and policymakers in southern Africa by providing a forum for the discussion of matters of common interest and by disseminating information about agriculture in the region to relevant agencies, organizations and companies. It has been very successful in obtaining external support for such activities, giving it an annual budget far in excess of that obtained from its annual membership fee. Funding bodies include:

- Alliance for a Green Revolution in Africa (AGRA)
- Bill and Melinda Gates Foundation (BMGF)
- Common Market for Eastern and Southern Africa (COMESA)
- European Commission
- International Fund for Agricultural Development (IFAD)
- Norwegian Agency for Development Cooperation (NORAD)
- Technical Centre for Agricultural and Rural Cooperation ACP-EU (CTA)
