= Spore (agricultural publication) =

Agricultural magazine published 1986–2019

- Categories: Agriculture
- Frequency: Bimonthly, later Quarterly
- First issue: 1 March 1986
- Final issue: December 2019
- Company: Technical Centre for Agricultural and Rural Cooperation ACP-EU (CTA)
- Country: Netherlands
- Language: English, French, Portuguese

Spore was a magazine published by the Technical Centre for Agricultural and Rural Cooperation ACP-EU (CTA) in English, French and, for a time, in Portuguese. It covered a wide range of agricultural topics and was extensively distributed and widely reproduced throughout African, Caribbean and Pacific (ACP) countries and elsewhere. Originally known as the "Bulletin of CTA" it later styled itself as "the magazine for agricultural and rural development in ACP countries". The final issue, No. 195, was published in December 2019. At its peak, the magazine reached over 50,000 subscribers and it was also published online.

== Origin ==
Spore was first published at the beginning 1986, two years after the establishment of CTA. The first issue noted that "rather than promoting the agency putting it out, ..........Spore aims to ensure the widest possible dissemination of information of relevance to the agricultural world, in order to fertilize ideas and allow them to germinate. It is in this down-to-earth way that Spore hopes to participate in the process of rural development." The first issue included articles on locusts, fertilizer response, bananas, aquaculture, rice husks for fuel, and sorghum. Initially published in English and French, a Portuguese version (Esporo) was added in 1993, although rising costs meant that this was discontinued in 2016.

== Distribution ==
The magazine appeared bimonthly until mid-2016, when it changed to being a quarterly publication. It also had an annual Special Issue in which a particular subject was treated in depth but these were discontinued from 2016. It was available in print free of charge to people living in ACP countries and online but increasing emphasis was put on online distribution and new subscriptions for hard copies were discouraged. Copies were also distributed through ACP ministries of agriculture and in partnership with local organisations, particularly where postal services were poor. In some countries the magazine was very effective in reaching remote areas. In 2012 the print run of all three languages combined was around 70,000, with 53,000 of these being sent out directly to subscribers. With 60,000 copies being distributed it was estimated that around 300,000 people read each issue but the potential audience was considered to have been close to one million. Surveys in Cameroon and Uganda found several examples of income-raising activities inspired by the magazine. It was also used in literacy and adult education programmes. According to Google Scholar, articles in Spore had been cited 83 times in academic journals by the beginning of February 2014.

== Reproduction of articles ==
Articles appearing in Spore could be freely reproduced for non-commercial use, if credited as coming from the magazine. Reproduction of Spore articles was widespread in ACP countries and elsewhere, both in national newspapers and international media services such as Africa Online and in journals and web sites specializing on agricultural topics, such as City Farmer.

== Contents ==
A typical issue contained a two-page in-depth report on a particular topic that was usually also featured on the cover. This was followed by news items presented under the categories of Agriculture, Fisheries and Livestock, Environment, Research and Business and Trade. Other features included an interview with someone active in the field of agriculture, a detailed 7-page "Dossier" on a major issue, reviews of agricultural publications, and news about the work of the publisher, CTA. Earlier issues included letters from readers but this was later discontinued in favour of the use of social media. Examples of Special Issues were those on Climate Change; Family Farming; Structured Grain Trading; Agricultural Value Chains; Modernizing Farms (2011); Population and Agriculture (2010).

== End of Publication ==
Spore ceased publication in December 2019 following the end of the Cotonou Agreement between the EU and ACP countries.

== Back numbers ==
Digital copies are available from JSTOR at
