= Eastern Africa Grain Council =

International trade organization

The Eastern Africa Grain Council (EAGC) is an organization representing those involved in the grain trade in Eastern Africa. It was registered in 2006 and is based in Nairobi, Kenya, with regional offices in Uganda, Tanzania, Rwanda, Burundi, Ethiopia and South Sudan. EAGC members can be grain traders, farmers or processors. All cereals traded in the region are covered, such as maize, wheat, rice, barley, sorghum, and millet. The Council is a not-for-profit company limited by guarantee, and works closely with donors and research Institutions.

EAGC argues that efforts to develop grains in the region have tended to concentrate on production issues and have failed to address market constraints. In an attempt to rectify this, EAGC has developed several regional activities, including the Eastern Africa Grain Institute (EAGI), which specializes in training and consultancy services, and the Regional Agricultural Trade Intelligence Network (RATIN), which provides marketing information. It runs an annual African Grain Trade Summit and issues a variety of publications, including one on Structured Grain Trading. It is also working to develop grades and standards for trade in the region.
