= Paula Pinho =

Spokesperson for the European Commission

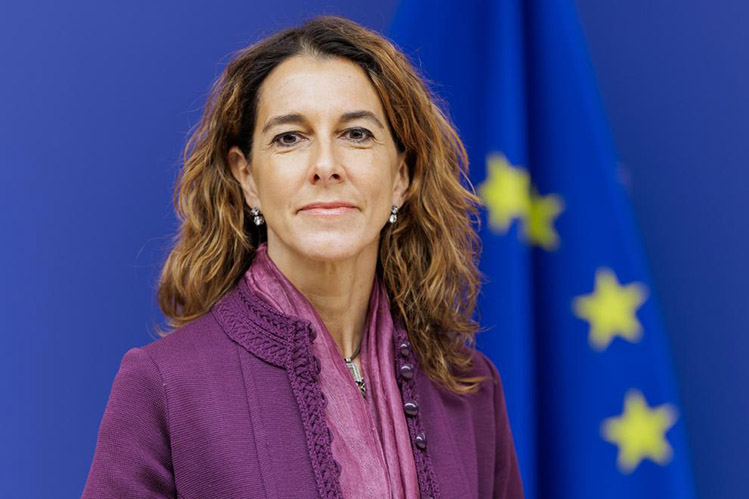
- Born: 1973 or 1974 (age 51–52); Porto, Portugal
- Education: Catholic University of Porto
- Occupation: Chief spokesperson for the European Commission
- Years active: 2024 -

Paula Pinho (born 1973 or 1974) is a Portuguese EU civil servant and lawyer who has worked for the EU Commission since 2000 and has been its spokesperson since December 2024, after being appointed by its president Ursula von der Leyen. She is the director of the European Commission’s DG for Energy and has previously been part of Günther Oettinger's cabinets both as his quality of commissioner for digital economy and society and as commissioner for energy. She is also in the Directorate General for Trade and the Internal Market.

== Biography ==
When Pinho finished secondary school in 1992, she attended the Catholic University of Porto, where she obtained her law degree. She joined the European Commission in 2000, serving as the director for just transition, consumers, efficiency and innovation in the Directorate-General (DG) for Energy.

In addition to her experience as director, Pinho also served in several European comissioners' offices throughout her career, such as Günther Oettinger's Office of the Commissioner for Energy.

In December 2024, she was appointed chief spokesperson for the European Commission by Ursula von der Leyen.
