= TRACECA =

International transportation cooperation organisation

Transport Corridor Europe-Caucasus-Asia
- Abbreviation: TRACECA
- Formation: May 1993; 32 years ago
- Founded at: Brussels, Belgium
- Type: Economic co-operation organization
- Headquarters: Baku, Azerbaijan
- Location: Eurasia
- Members: 14
- Secretary General: Asset Assavbayev
- Main organ: TRACECA Intergovernmental Commission
- Website: www.traceca-org.org/en/home/

TRACECA (acronym: Transport Corridor Europe-Caucasus-Asia) is an international transport programme involving 14 countries from the European Union, Eastern Europe, the Caucasus, and Central Asia. The programme aim is to strengthen economic relations, trade, and transport in the regions of the Black Sea basin, the South Caucasus, and Central Asia. It has a permanent Secretariat, originally financed by the European Commission, in Baku, Azerbaijan, and a regional office in Odesa, Ukraine.

== Origins ==
TRACECA was established in May 1993 in Brussels, upon the signing of a Multilateral Agreement on International Transport for the development of transport initiatives (including the establishment and development of a road corridor) between EU member states, Eastern European, Caucasus and Central Asian countries. The programme supports the political and economic independence of former Soviet Union republics through enhancing their access to European and global markets through road, rail and sea. The objectives of TRACECA were underlined by the Baku Initiative of 2004, followed by a further ministerial conference in Sofia, Bulgaria, in 2006.

== Membership ==
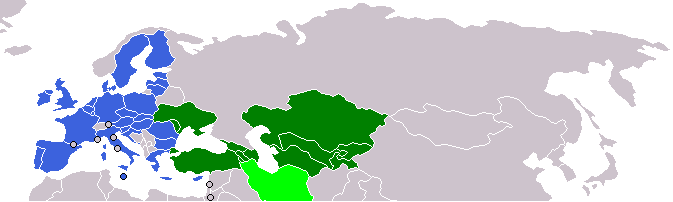
European Union TRACECA participating states TRACECA agreement signed, but not yet participating

The following states currently participate in the TRACECA program:

- Armenia
- Azerbaijan
- Georgia
- Iran
- Kazakhstan
- Kyrgyzstan
- Moldova
- Tajikistan
- Turkey
- Turkmenistan
- Ukraine
- Uzbekistan

Plus two member states of the EU:

- Bulgaria
- Romania

Iran officially joined TRACECA in 2009 after their request was accepted during a meeting held in Brussels. However, technical assistance has not been provided to Iran since 2010 due to EU sanctions.

=== Observer members ===
In 1996, Mongolia was granted observer status. In 2009, Lithuania was granted observer status. In July 2016, Greece announced they were considering joining TRACECA activities as an observer. In March 2018, Greece was granted observer status during a meeting held in Yerevan.

== International cooperation ==
TRACECA has signed numerous Memorandums of Understanding and cooperation agreements with other international organizations, including the Central Asia Regional Economic Cooperation Program, Economic Cooperation Organization, European Civil Aviation Conference, International Road Transport Union, International Union of Railways, Organisation for Co‑operation between Railways, Organization of the Black Sea Economic Cooperation, United Nations Economic Commission for Europe, and the United Nations Economic and Social Commission for Asia and the Pacific.

In July 2023, it was announced that TRACECA would join the eTIR international system.

== Secretary-General ==
The Permanent Secretariat of TRACECA was established in March 2000 in Baku, and inaugurated on 21 February 2001, with the participation of the then President of Azerbaijan Heydar Aliyev, together with Javier Solana, Christopher Patten, Anna Lind. The Secretary-General is a chief executive officer of the Permanent Secretariat. The first Secretary-General elected by the Intergovernmental Commission was a representative of Georgia, ambassador Zviad Kvachantiradze.

The current Secretary-General is Asset Assavbayev, appointed by the Intergovernmental Commission in December 2019.

No.	Secretary-General	Dates in office	Country of origin	Ref
1	Zviad Kvachantiradze	2000–2002	Georgia	
2	Abdurashid Tagirov	2002–2003	Uzbekistan	
3	Lyudmila Trenkova	2003–2006	Bulgaria	
4	Rustan Jenalinov	2006–2009	Kazakhstan	
5	Zhantoro Satybaldiyev	2009–2011	Kyrgyzstan	
6	Eduard Biriucov	2011–2014	Moldova	
7	Mircea Ciopraga	2015–2019	Romania	
8	Asset Assavbayev	2019–present	Kazakhstan	

== Projects ==
TRACECA has five working groups: maritime transport, aviation, road and rail, transport security, and transport infrastructure. Amongst its specific projects, was the creation of a new bridge to replace and protect the heritage Red Bridge, located between Georgia and Azerbaijan.

== See also ==
- Baku Initiative
- Eastern Partnership
- Euronest Parliamentary Assembly
- European integration
- Trans-Caspian International Transport Route
- Trans-European Transport Networks
- Transport in the European Union
- Transport in Europe
