= ACP–EU development cooperation =

Cooperation between the EU and the ACP countries

ACP States

Development cooperation between the European Union (EU) and the countries of the African, Caribbean and Pacific Group of States (ACP) started in 1957 with the Treaty of Rome, which first established a collective European development policy. The Treaty of Rome granted associated status to 31 overseas collectivities and territories (OCTs) and provided for the creation of a European Development Fund (EDF) intended to grant technical and financial assistance to the countries which were still under European rule at the time. More significantly, however, by means of the Treaty of Rome the six member states of the European Economic Community were expressing solidarity with the colonies and OCTs and committed themselves to contribute to their prosperity. The EDF has to date been funded outside the EU budget by the EU Member States on the basis of financial payments related to specific contribution shares, or “keys”, which are subject to negotiation. Until 2021, the EDF was the only EU policy instrument that is financed through a specific key that is different from the EU budget key, and which reflects the comparative interests of individual Member States. However, as of 2021, the EDF has been integrated into the general EU budget under the Neighbourhood, Development and International Cooperation Instrument (NDICI - Global Europe). The Cotonou Agreement, which had governed ACP–EU relations since 2000, was succeeded by the Samoa Agreement (formally the OACPS–EU Partnership Agreement), signed on 15 November 2023 and provisionally applied from 1 January 2024, which sets the overarching framework for relations for the following twenty years.

== Main actors ==
=== The European Union ===
Beginning in 1957 (Rome Treaty) a group of 6 nations in Western Europe, France, Germany, Italy, The Netherlands, Belgium, and Luxembourg, created the European Economic Community (EEC). These member states were gradually joined by others through various waves of enlargement and became the European Union.

=== The African, Caribbean and Pacific Group of States ===
Similarly to European expansion, at the time of the Treaty of Rome, there were a limited number of nations involved. Beginning with 18 countries and territories that had special relations with the member states, the so-called Associated States gained membership, eventually establishing the group known as the African, Caribbean and Pacific Group of States.

== History ==
=== The Yaoundé Agreements ===
The first cycle of the EDF was designed for a period of five years and took effect in 1959 (now in its 10th cycle and with a budget of €22.7 billion). As it drew to a close, however, many of the OCTs had regained independence and new arrangements were necessary. In 1963, representatives of the EEC Member States and 17 African countries and Madagascar met in Yaoundé, Cameroon, to sign their first partnership agreement in history. The group of developing countries which signed the final agreement were granted preferential trade arrangements such as the duty-free access of specified African goods into the European market. In addition, it was agreed to continue support via the EDF and the European Investment Bank (EIB) (p. 29).

In 1969 the agreements made in the first Yaoundé Convention were renewed by the second Yaoundé Convention which lasted until 1975.

One of the most important aspects of Yaoundé was its foundation on the recognition of national sovereignty of all participating countries. It was furthermore not only unprecedented in its form but also unique in its comprehensiveness, covering aspects from financial and technical assistance (through the EDF) to investment and capital movements (through the EIB) to trade preferences. The structure established in Yaoundé remains the framework for many aspects of ACP-EU cooperation until today.

=== The Lomé Conventions ===
The Yaoundé II Agreement expired in 1974 and was succeeded by a new Convention, signed in and named after the capital of Togo: Lomé. The establishment of a new preferential trade agreement instead of a continuation of the old one was incited by both unsatisfactory outcomes of the previous arrangement as well as changes in the European political framework. From the developing countries’ point of view, the call for new negotiations was prompted by the strong neo-colonial aspects which were still detectable in the Yaoundé Agreement and the disappointing economic results it had produced. From a European point of view, the development strategy experienced a shift from a regional to a more global approach with the introduction of the Generalized System of Preferences (GSP) in 1971. Simultaneously, the accession of the United Kingdom to the European Community in 1973 meant that the Francophone focus of development policy was soon shifted to include the developing countries of the Commonwealth of Nations.

The Lomé Convention was an attempt to rectify the inefficiencies created in Yaoundé and to address the various points of criticism it had been subjected to. As a result of the enlargement and in line with the more global development policy of the EC a group of African, Caribbean and Pacific countries joined forces to enter into negotiations. The Agreement was signed after 18 months of negotiations in February 1975 by the nine EC Member States and 46 developing countries which became formally known as the ACP countries. Although colonial ties with Europe remained to be a decisive factor for the new signatories’ participation, the composition of the group of developing countries showed a slow diversification of European development policy and therefore silenced some of the voices which had criticised the selective approach of Yaoundé.

=== The Cotonou Agreement ===
Caribbean group East and South Africa group Pacific group West African group Southern African group Central African group East Africa group

The relationship between the European Union (EU) and the ACP group changed significantly during the 1990s. The historical ties which had been the most prominent features of earlier agreements had been eroded and the ACP countries’ importance to the EU was diminished. In the light of the completion of the Single Market Programme in 1992 and due to the end of the Cold War, the EU had turned towards development issues which were a bit "closer to home", namely in Central and Eastern Europe. Although the relationship between the EU and the ACP countries was continued it was marked by the changing political situation of its time. The wave of democratization which reached many developing countries after the end of the Cold War led to a previously unknown politicization of development cooperation. Additionally, the continuing absence of the economic rewards expected from Lomé, its continuing incompatibility with General Agreement on Tariffs and Trade (GATT)/World Trade Organization (WTO) provisions and the complexity the Lomé Conventions had assumed were reasons why a new agreement was drawn up in Cotonou, the capital of Benin.

The Cotonou Agreement is the latest of the PTAs between the EU and the ACP group. It was signed in June 2000 by 78 ACP countries and the EU-15. It lasted for a period of 20 years and is based on four main principles: partnership, participation, dialogue and mutual obligations, and differentiation and regionalisation. Building on the experience of nearly 40 years of development cooperation, the Cotonou Agreement introduced some important innovations.

One of the most significant changes was the introduction of a political dimension to EU-ACP development cooperation. This aspect of Cotonou has been subject to some of its fiercest discussion and criticism because it linked development cooperation to conditionality. Respect for human rights, democracy and the rule of law have become so-called "essential elements" the violation of which can lead to partial or total suspension of development aid. Conditionality is one of the issues which have been considered to be undermining the principle of equal partnership on which Lomé was based.

Another important innovation of the Cotonou Agreement was the acknowledgment of the civil society and especially the private sector as an essential element to foster economic development, represented in the principle of participation. Therefore, provisions were included at Cotonou which ensured the participation of non-state actors in ACP countries in the policy process of their respective state. Furthermore, the Cotonou Agreement put more emphasis on regional integration within the ACP group and especially in Africa.

The most radical change which the Cotonou Agreement implied was the establishment of the so-called Economic Partnership Agreements (EPA's) which are scheduled to take effect in 2008.

The Cotonou Agreement came to an end in 2020 and the ACP Group is of 2012 studying options for its future beyond this state. Other independent experts such as the European Centre for Development Policy Management (ECDPM) have also offered ideas on options for the ACP Group's future after 2020.

There were negotiations for the 11th European Development Fund, proposed to cover the period 2014–2020. This one-year extension compared to the 10th EDF allows the end of the 11th EDF to coincide with the expiration of the Cotonou Partnership Agreement.

== See also ==
- ACP EU Joint Parliamentary Assembly
- Foreign relations of the European Union
- CARIFORUM–United Kingdom Economic Partnership Agreement
- EU-ACP Economic Partnership Agreements
- Global Europe
- The Courier (ACP-EU) : The magazine of Africa–Caribbean–Pacific and European Union cooperation and relations
