= Pacific Islands Private Sector Organisation =

Organization dedicated to promoting role of private sector in Pacific Island development

The Pacific Islands Private Sector Organisation (PIPSO) was established in 2007 to promote the private sector's role in policy making and to encourage business development through effective partnerships with governments, regional organisations, development partners and NGOs. Its headquarters are in Suva, Fiji.

PIPSO is a regional umbrella organisation whose members are mainly national private sector organisations from each of the fourteen Pacific Islands Forum countries, together with that from American Samoa. It aims to assist members to formulate national private sector strategies and to advocate the interests of the private sector and also provides business development services for the Pacific. It describes its mission as being to “facilitate private sector-driven economic growth for the benefit of the region”. The organisation was first formally proposed at a meeting of the Forum Heads of Governments in October, 2005. PIPSO began operations in April 2007, with support from the Pacific Islands Forum Secretariat (PIFS) and UNDP. The organisation pays particular attention to the development of female entrepreneurs and conducted its first Pacific Islands Women in Business conference in 2014.

In addition to the Pacific Forum, donors and the regional private sector, PIPSO collaborates closely with other organisations such as the Pacific Community (SPC), Melanesian Spearhead Group (MSG), University of the South Pacific (USP), and Technical Centre for Agricultural and Rural Cooperation ACP-EU (CTA).
