= Lomé Convention =

1975 EEC economic agreement with African, Caribbean and Pacific states

The Lomé Convention is a trade and aid agreement between the European Economic Community (EEC) and 71 African, Caribbean, and Pacific (ACP) countries, first signed in February 1975 in Lomé, Togo.

== History ==
The first Lomé Convention (Lomé I), which came into force in April 1976, was designed to provide a new framework of cooperation between the then European Economic Community (EEC) and developing ACP countries, in particular former British, Dutch, Belgian and French colonies. It had two main aspects: It provided for most ACP agricultural and mineral exports to enter the EEC free of duty. Preferential access based on a quota system was agreed for products, such as sugar and beef, in competition with EEC agriculture. Secondly, the EEC committed European Unit of Account (EUA) 3 billion for aid and investment in the ACP countries.

The convention was renegotiated and renewed three times. Lomé II (January 1981 to February 1985) increased aid and investment expenditure to EUA 5.5 billion. Lomé III came into force in March 1985 (trade provisions) and May 1986 (aid), and expired in 1990; it increased commitments to EUA 8.5 billion. Lomé IV was signed in December 1989. Its trade provisions cover the ten years, 1990 to 1999. Aid and investment commitments for the first five years amounted to EUA 12 billion. In all, some 70 ACP countries are party to Lomé IV, compared with 46 signatories of Lomé I.

Lomé development aid was dispersed primarily through the European Development Fund; investment assistance was mainly channelled through the European Investment Bank. Two other important mechanisms were the Stabex and Sysmin schemes, which provided compensatory finance to ACP states for adverse fluctuations in the world prices of, respectively, key agricultural and mineral exports.

The emergence of the single European market at the end of 1992 affected ACP preferential access to EU markets. The Caribbean's many smallholder banana farmers argued for the continuation of their preferential access to traditional markets, notably the United Kingdom. They feared that otherwise the EU would be flooded with cheap bananas from the Central American plantations, with devastating effects on several Caribbean economies. Negotiations led in 1993 to the EU agreeing to maintain the Caribbean producers' preferential access until the end of Lomé IV, pending possible negotiation on an extension.

In 1995, the United States government petitioned to the World Trade Organization to investigate whether the Lomé IV convention had violated WTO rules. Then later in 1996, the WTO Dispute Settlement Body ruled in favor of the plaintiffs, effectively ending the cross-subsidies that had benefited ACP countries for many years. But the US remained unsatisfied and insisted that all preferential trade agreements between the EU and ACP should cease. The WTO Dispute Settlement Body established another panel to discuss the issue and concluded that agreements between the EU and ACP were indeed not compatible with WTO regulations. Finally, the EU negotiated with the US through WTO to reach an agreement.

== See also ==
- ACP countries
- ACP-EU Development Cooperation
- Cotonou Agreement
- Stabex
- The Courier (ACP-EU)
