= European Development Fund =

Fund for European Union aid to other areas

The European Development Fund (EDF) was the main instrument for European Union (EU) aid for development cooperation in African, Caribbean and Pacific (ACP) countries and the Overseas Countries and Territories (OCT). Funding was provided by voluntary donations from EU member states. Until 2020, the EDF was subject to its own financial rules and procedures and was managed by the European Commission (EC) and the European Investment Bank. The EDF has been incorporated into the EU's general budget as of the 2021–2027 multi-annual financial framework.

Articles 131 and 136 of the 1957 Treaty of Rome provided for the creation of the EDF with a view to granting technical and financial assistance to African countries that were still colonised at that time and with which certain countries had historical links. Usually lasting 6 years, each EDF lays out EU assistance to both individual countries and regions as a whole. In 2000, the EU transitioned from post-colonial aid to partnership agreements with ACP Group countries, as set out in the Cotonou Agreement. This introduced governance reforms, sustainable development and human rights as key priorities.

== Funding ==
Until its incorporation into the EU's general budget in 2021, the EDF was funded outside the EU budget by EU member states based on financial payments related to specific contribution shares, or "keys". The member state contribution keys were subject to negotiation. The EDF was the only EU policy instrument financed through a specific key different from the EU budget key, reflecting the comparative interests of individual member states.

There was a debate on whether to 'budgetise' the EDF. However, in the Communication A budget for Europe 2020, the European Commission stressed that it was not appropriate at the time to propose integrating the EDF into the EU budget. The perceived advantages included the fact that:

- contributions would have been based on gross national income, and this may have increased voluntary contributions
- the harmonisation of the EU budget and EDF administration might have decreased administration costs and increased the effectiveness of aid
- 20% of aid to ACP countries already originates from the EU budget
- an all-ACP geographic strategy was no longer relevant, as programmes were more localised to regional or country-level
- there would have been increased democratic control and parliamentary scrutiny

The perceived disadvantages were that:

- 90% of EDF resources reached low-income countries as opposed to less than 40% of aid from the EU budget development instruments
- there would be a loss of aid predictability and aid quality, as the EU budget is annual, unlike the EDF's 6-year budget

In 2005, the EU and its member states agreed to achieve a collective level of official development assistance of 0.7% of gross national income by 2015 and an interim target of 0.56% by 2010, with differentiated intermediate targets for those EU member states which had recently joined the Union. On 23 May 2011, EU ministers responsible for development cooperation gathered to take stock of progress made and concluded that additional efforts would be needed to close an estimated €50 billion gap to reach the self-imposed collective EU target of 0.7% by 2015.

By 2015, the EU had not reached its target of 0.7% of gross national income, though the commitment to this target was recently reaffirmed. The commitment held no deadline. CONCORD, the European confederation for relief and development, described the pledge as "vague and non-binding" and said 2020 should be the new deadline.

The EDF has been incorporated into the EU's general budget as of the 2021–2027 multi-annual financial framework.

== Agenda for Change ==
The European Commission's development strategy – Agenda for Change – put 'inclusive and sustainable growth for human development' at its centre. Adopted in 2011, it adopted 2 reforms designed to make its development policy both more strategic and more targeted. The Agenda for Change made new policies and rules for budget support. The three main elements of this Agenda were:

- Targeting and concentrating aid
- Budget support (or 'State Building Contracts' in fragile states)
- Other reforms for effectiveness – joint programming, common results framework, innovative financing (such as blending loans and grants), and Policy Coherence for Development

== 10th EDF 2008–2013 ==
The 10th EDF (2008–2013) had a budget of €22.7 billion. This represented about 30% of EU spending on development cooperation aid, with the remainder coming directly from the EU budget.

The budget of the 10th EDF can be broken down as follows:

- €21,966 million to the ACP countries (97% of the total),
  - €17,766 million to the national and regional indicative programmes (81% of the ACP total),
  - €2,700 million to intra-ACP and intra-regional cooperation (12% of the ACP total),
  - €1,500 million to Investment Facilities (7% of the ACP total).
- €286 million to the OCTs (1% of the total),
- €430 million to the commission as support expenditure for programming and implementation of the EDF (2% of the total).

== 11th EDF 2014–2020 ==
The 11th EDF was valid from 2014 to 2020. This one-year extension, compared to the 10th EDF, allowed the 11th EDF to end in 2020, coinciding with the expiration of the Cotonou Agreement and the EU budget period.

== After 2021 ==
The EDF has been superseded by the Global Europe instrument, which is integrated into the EU's 2021–2027 multi-annual financial framework. For the European Parliament, this creates a chance for a greater say in how these funds are distributed.

== Critics ==
Independent research by the European Centre for Development Policy Management (ECDPM), a think tank based in Maastricht, the Netherlands, shows that the EU has ensured the effective translation into practice of two key policy commitments of the Agenda for Change: a more focused strategy for less developed countries (LDCs) and low-income countries (LICs), and the concentration of EU aid on a limited number of sectors and policy priorities. Their research found that the high degree of compliance was achieved "through top-level support and tight control from headquarters".

While the principles of the Agenda for Change appear to have been followed, ECDPM showed that in many countries, initial programming proposals based on in-country consultations, managed by EU Delegations, were consequently superseded by the decisions of EU headquarters in Brussels. Although the 11th EDF is closely aligned with national development plans, there is evidence that this top-down programming approach has led to a significant erosion of key aid and development effectiveness principles, in particular, country ownership.

== See also ==
- ACP-EU Development Cooperation
- ACP-EU Joint Parliamentary Assembly
- The Courier – a former magazine of Africa-Caribbean-Pacific and European Union cooperation and relations
- Development Cooperation Instrument
- EuropeAid Co-Operation Office
