= Directorate-General for International Partnerships =

European Commission department

The Directorate-General for International Partnerships (DG International Partnerships or DG INTPA) is the European Commission department responsible for international development policy. It operates under the authority of the European Commissioner for International Partnerships, currently Jozef Síkela.

The official development assistance (ODA) disbursed by the European Commission increased in 2022 (USD 23.1 billion), mostly due to support to Ukraine, some of which was in the form of loans. The European Union (EU) – EU institutions and member states together – accounts for the largest share of total ODA among Development Assistance Committee (DAC) members and has a development co-operation presence in all regions and across all sectors. Among the EU institutions, the European Commission and the European Investment Bank (EIB) manage funding. The European External Action Service co-ordinates foreign policy.

== History ==
The Directorate-General for Development and Cooperation – EuropeAid was formed on 1 January 2011 following the merger of the EuropeAid Cooperation Office (AIDCO) with the Directorate-General for Development and Relations with African, Caribbean and Pacific States (DEV). AIDCO had been founded on 1 January 2001 with the mission of implementing the EU external aid programmes around the world. At that time, DG DEV and the Directorate-General for External Relations (RELEX) were responsible for policy and programming.

Following the creation of EuropeAid in 2011, Director-General Fokion Fotiadis was responsible for the overall realisation of the DG's mission, which consists in the programming and implementation of the European Commission's external aid instruments financed by the European Union budget and the European Development Funds. In November 2013, Fernando Frutuoso de Melo succeeded Fokion Fotiadis as Director-General of the Directorate-General.

EuropeAid focused on maximising the value and impact of aid funding by making sure support was provided in a manner which complied with EU development objectives and the United Nations' Millennium Development Goals in a speedy and accountable fashion. Effective implementation and delivery of aid also helps the Commission and the EU as a whole to attain a higher profile on the world stage. The European Union is the world's largest development aid donor.

DG Development and Cooperation – EuropeAid was reformed into current form on 1 January 2015. As of 16 January 2021, the DG International Cooperation and Development (DEVCO) became DG International Partnerships (INTPA).

== Development policy ==
DG International Partnerships formulates the European Union's development policy abroad. Its mission is to help reduce and ultimately eradicate poverty in developing countries through the promotion of sustainable development, democracy, peace and security.

It works on policy formulation at a global and sectoral level. The main intervention areas covered are: trade and regional integration, environment and the sustainable management of natural resources, infrastructure, communications and transport, water and energy, rural development, governance, democracy and human rights, peace and security, human development, social cohesion and employment. EU development action is based on the European Consensus on Development, which was endorsed on 20 December 2005 by EU Member States, the Council, the European Parliament and the Commission.

== From policy to action ==
When implementing projects, it takes account of EU policy strategies and long-term programmes for the delivery of aid. It translates policies into practical actions and develops new ways of delivering aid, such as budget support and through sectoral approaches. It also issues guidelines and makes evaluations of aid implementation. In addition, it is responsible for the proper management of funds and must use clear and transparent tendering and contracting procedures. The programming cycle and responsibilities have evolved with the creation of the European External Action Service EEAS. The EEAS has a key role in the programming of geographic instruments with EuropeAid and the EU Delegations.

Directorate-General is responsible for all the steps of an aid delivery project: after identifying needs, it carries out feasibility studies and prepares all the necessary financial decisions and controls. It then moves on to drawing up the required tendering, monitoring and evaluation procedures. EuropeAid often publishes these evaluations in its website, aiming to improve management, in particular by taking into account the lessons of past public actions and to reinforce capacity to account for, and to ensure, better transparency.

This institution is a decentralised organisation. Two out of three Commission staff members working on aid implementation are based in the field. That is why most of the preparatory and implementation work is done through the EU Delegations in the beneficiary countries. Directorate-General is made up of more than 43 units divided into nine directorates attached to the Director General.

== Promoting joint effort ==
To ensure coherence, complementarity and coordination in implementing external assistance programmes worldwide, DG INTPA works in close collaboration with its various partners. The overall aim is to make external aid more effective. Civil society, international organisations and governments of member states of the European Union are all important actors in this field.

== Funding ==
Directorate-General awards grants and contracts to implement projects or activities that relate to the European Union's external aid programmes. To ensure that EuropeAid's work to improve people's lives is recognised, a set of visibility guidelines have been produced. These guidelines ensure that aid projects acknowledge the funding support they receive from Commission budgets. They also help to raise the general profile of the EU across the world.

Development aid is financed directly by the EU budget (70%) as part of the financial instruments for external action and also by the European Development Fund (EDF) (30%). The EU's external action financing is divided into 'geographic' and 'thematic' instruments. The 'geographic' instruments provide aid through the Development Cooperation Instrument (DCI, €16.9 billion, 2007–2013), which must spend 95% of its budget on official development assistance (ODA), and from the European Neighbourhood and Partnership Instrument (ENPI), which contains some relevant programmes. According to the OECD, 2020 official development assistance from EU institutions increased by 25.4% to US$19.4 billion. The EDF (€22.7 bn, 2008–2013) is made up of voluntary contributions by EU Member States. There is currently a debate on whether to 'budgetise' the EDF. The perceived advantages include:

- contributions would be based on GNI and this may increase the currently voluntary contributions
- the harmonisation of EU budget and EDF administration might decrease administration costs and increase aid effectiveness
- an all-Africa, Caribbean, and Pacific countries geographic strategy is no longer relevant as programmes are more localised to regions or country-level
- there would be increase democratic control and parliamentary scrutiny

The perceived disadvantages are that:

- 90% of EDF resources reach low-income countries as opposed to less than 40% of aid from the EU budget development instruments
- a loss of aid predictability and aid quality as the EU budget is annual, unlike the 6-year budget of the EDF

== See also ==
- ACP-EU Development Cooperation
- European Commissioner for International Partnerships
- European Development Fund
- Eurosolar
- Foreign relations of the European Union
- Technical Assistance to the Commonwealth of Independent States
