= European Centre for Development Policy Management =

Think tank in Belgium and the Netherlands

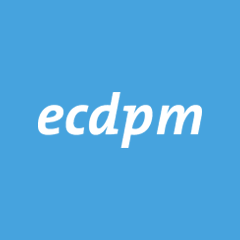
- Abbreviation: ECDPM
- Formation: 1986
- Type: Think Tank
- Headquarters: Onze Lieve Vrouweplein 21, Maastricht 6211 HE
- Location: Maastricht, Netherlands (Head Office), Belgium, Brussels Office
- Director: San Bilal
- Website: http://www.ecdpm.org

The European Centre for Development Policy Management, more commonly known as ECDPM, is a think tank founded in 1986. It is headquartered in Maastricht, Netherlands and has a second office in Brussels, Belgium.

ECDPM researches Europe-Africa relations, aiming "to promote innovative forms of international cooperation involving European and African actors to address major global development challenges".

== Aims and objectives ==
ECDPM's mission is to "make policies in Europe and Africa work for inclusive and sustainable development."

== Thematic workstreams ==
ECDPM organises its work under 3 main thematic clusters and within each cluster, there are 10 workstreams:

Europe and Africa in the world

- EU foreign and development policy
- Migration and mobility
- Digital economy and governance
- AU-EU relations

Peaceful societies and accountable governance

- Peace, security and resilience
- Democratic governance and accountability
- Economic recovery and transformation
- Climate change and green transition

Sustainable African economies and climate action

- African economic integration
- Sustainable food systems

== Funding ==
ECDPM receives strategic and financial support from the governments of several countries, notably the Netherlands, Belgium, Austria, Ireland, Denmark, Estonia, Finland, Sweden and Luxembourg. Other institutions and organisations also provide ECDPM with funding on a project basis.

== Partnerships ==
ECDPM collaborates with several think tanks, governments and other institutions to create webinar series, interviews series and papers and commentaries.

ECDPM is part of the ETTG (European Think Tank Group) network. Other think tanks in this network are ODI, Elcano Royal Institute, Istituto Affari Internazionali, the German Development Institute and IDDRI.

== See also ==
- Brussels effect

== Sources ==
- preval.org
- lencd.com
- www.s2bnetwork.org
- www.fes.de
- www.inwent.org
