= Neighbourhood, Development and International Cooperation Instrument =

EU financial instrument

Global Europe
- Created: 8 June 2021
- Ratified: 14 June 2021
- Date effective: 1 January 2021
- Commissioned by: European Parliament; Council of the EU
- Subject: Establishment of Global Europe fund, repealing Decision No 466/2014/EU of the European Parliament and of the Council and repealing Regulation (EU) 2017/1601 of the European Parliament and of the Council, and Council Regulation (EC, Euratom) No 480/2009
- Purpose: Financing instrument

Official website
Global Europe
- Funding agency: EU member budgets
- Sponsors: Non-EU members (voluntary contributions)
- Framework programme: Global Gateway EU
- Reference: PE/41/2021/INIT OJ L 209, 14.6.2021, pp.1 – 78) (Note: Initial EUR-Lex version)
- Location: Non-EU Europe; North Africa; Sub-Saharan Africa; Asia–Pacific; Americas and the Caribbean
- Project coordinator: Directorate-General for Enlargement and Eastern Neighbourhood
- Participants: Armenia; Azerbaijan; Georgia; Moldova; Ukraine
- Budget: Total: €79,500 million period of 2021– 2027; Funding: (see §)
- Duration: 2021 fiscal year – present

The Neighbourhood, Development and International Cooperation Instrument – Global Europe, also known as the NDICI-GE or simply Global Europe, is a European Union financial instrument through which the EU invests in development, improving governance, and fighting climate change in non-EU states.

The NDICI-GE is part of the wider Global Gateway strategy.

== History ==
Negotiations for the establishment of the NDICI-GE were concluded in December 2020, and the structure of the instrument was approved by the Council of the European Union. In March 2021, it was endorsed in principle by the European Parliament. The regulation legally authorising the NDICI was approved by the Council and Parliament on 9 June; it came into force on 14 June, but applied retroactively to 1 January 2021.

Since its adoption, the NDICI-GE is the EU's main financial instrument for development and foreign aid. Previously, EU external spending on development was channelled through multiple separate financial instruments.

The European Commission conducted a mid-term evaluation of the NDICI-GE in 2024. It concluded that the instrument had proven "fit for purpose", but noted that, despite improvements over previous funding mechanisms it was still insufficiently flexible to respond to unexpected global events.

== Composition ==
The Instrument has a total budget of €79.46 billion. At its establishment, it was broken down into four pillars:

- The "geographic" pillar: €60.39bn, of which:
  - at least €19.32 is for the EU's "neighbourhood" – non-EU member states in Eastern and Southeastern Europe, and North Africa
  - at least €29.18bn is for states in Sub-Saharan Africa
  - at least €8.49bn is for states in the Asia–Pacific region
  - at least €3.39bn is for states in the Americas and the Caribbean
  - unspecified amounts are allocated to overseas countries and territories of EU member states, and to states which have begun the EU accession process
- The "thematic pillar": €6.36bn, of which:
  - €1.36bn is for projects related to human rights and democracy
  - €1.36bn is for civil society organisations
  - €910 million is for peace, stability and conflict resolution
  - €2.73bn is for "global challenges", including health, education, empowerment of women and children, migration and forced displacement, and food security
- The "rapid response pillar": €3.18bn
  - Available to respond to emerging crises, humanitarian needs and "the EU's foreign policy needs and priorities"
- €9.53bn in unallocated funds, to top up other areas of the Instrument as necessary over its lifetime

10% of the total budget is "dedicated particularly to actions supporting management and governance of migration and forced displacement". States in receipt of funding can unlock additional funds above those allocated to them in the initial budget if they are able to demonstrate progress in cooperating with the EU to reduce irregular migration into Europe.

As of 2024, more than 80% of the unallocated "cushion" had been spent, with much of it going to Ukraine following its invasion by Russia in 2022.

== Criticism ==
The NDICI-GE has been criticised by civil society groups for the "lack of transparency" in how its funds are allocated. Oxfam has alleged that it "prioritise[s] the EU’s domestic migration concerns over development objectives".
