= Cotonou Agreement =

2000 EU economic and legal treaty with African, Caribbean and Pacific states

ACP states

Caribbean group East and South Africa group Pacific group West African group Southern African group Central African group East Africa group

The Cotonou Agreement (French: Accord de Cotonou) is a treaty between the European Union (EU) and the African, Caribbean and Pacific Group of States (ACP). It was signed in June 2000 in Cotonou, Benin's largest city, by 78 ACP countries (except Cuba) and the then fifteen EU member states. It entered into force in 2003 and was subsequently revised in 2005 and 2010.

Following the 2010 revision, the agreement was due to expire on 29 February 2020, but it was extended temporarily to no later than 31 October 2023, pending adoption of a new agreement (the Samoa Agreement).

== Aims ==
The Cotonou Agreement is aimed at the reduction and eventual eradication of poverty while contributing to sustainable development and to the gradual integration of ACP countries into the world economy. The revised Cotonou Agreement is also concerned with the fight against impunity and promotion of criminal justice through the International Criminal Court.

== Main principles ==
The Cotonou Agreement replaced the Lomé Convention, which had been the basis for ACP-EU development cooperation since 1975. The Cotonou Agreement, however, is much broader in scope than any previous arrangement has ever been. It is designed to last for a period of 20 years and is based on four main principles:

- Equality of partners and ownership of development strategies. In principle, it is up to ACP states to determine how their societies and their economies should develop.
- Participation. In addition to the central government as the main actor, partnership under the Cotonou Agreement is open to other actors (e.g., civil society, the private sector, and local governments).
- Dialogue and mutual obligations. The Cotonou Agreement is not merely a pot of money. The signatories have assumed mutual obligations (e.g., respect for human rights) which will be monitored through continuing dialogue and evaluation.
- Differentiation and regionalisation. Cooperation agreements will vary according to each partner's level of development, needs, performance and long-term development strategy. Special treatment will be given to countries that are considered least developed or vulnerable (landlocked or island states).

== Political dimension ==
The Cotonou Agreement wishes to give a stronger political foundation to ACP-EU development cooperation. Therefore, political dialogue is one of the key aspects of the arrangements and addresses new issues which have previously been outside the scope of development cooperation, such as peace and security, arms trade and migration.

Furthermore, the element of "good governance" has been included as an "essential element" of the Cotonou Agreement, the violation of which may lead to the partial or complete suspension of development cooperation between the EU and the country in violation. It was furthermore agreed that serious cases of corruption, including acts of bribery, could trigger a consultation process and possibly lead to a suspension of aid.

== New actors ==
A second new feature of the Cotonou Agreement relates to the participation of non-state actors and local governments in development cooperation. They are now considered complementary actors to central governments who traditionally have been the key actors of cooperation between the EU and the ACP countries.

Although ACP governments continue to be responsible for determining their own development strategy, non-state actors and local authorities are now involved being consulted with regard to its formulation. They are furthermore provided with access to financial resources and involved in implementation. They also receive capacity building support. The Technical Centre for Agricultural and Rural Cooperation ACP-EU (CTA) operates within the framework of the ACP-EU Cotonou Agreement with a mission to "strengthen policy and institutional capacity development and information and communication management capacities of ACP agricultural and rural development organisations". This it does, in part, through its magazine Spore, which is widely circulated in ACP states.

The Cotonou Agreement focuses especially on the private sector as an instrument for sustainable economic development. A new comprehensive programme has been introduced in Cotonou in order to support the private sectors of the ACP countries with new tools such as access to funding via the European Investment Bank (EIB).

== Trade cooperation ==
Probably the most radical change introduced by the Cotonou Agreement concerns trade cooperation. Since the First Lomé Convention in 1975, the EU has granted non-reciprocal trade preferences to ACP countries. Under the Cotonou Agreement, however, this system was replaced by the Economic Partnership Agreements (EPAs), a new scheme that took effect in 2008. This new arrangement provides for reciprocal trade agreements, meaning that not only the EU provides duty-free access to its markets for ACP exports, but ACP countries also provide duty-free access to their own markets for EU exports.

True to the Cotonou principle of differentiation, however, not all ACP countries have to open their markets to EU products after 2008. The group of least developed countries is able to either continue cooperation under the arrangements made in Lomé or the "Everything But Arms" regulation.

Non-LDCs, on the other hand, who decide they are not in a position to enter into EPAs can for example be transferred into the EU's Generalized System of Preferences (GSP), or the Special Incentive Arrangement for Sustainable Development and Good Governance (GSP+).

== Programming ==
The Cotonou Agreement introduces the idea of performance-based partnerships and abandons "aid entitlements" like fixed allocations regardless of performance.

Under the new agreement, the EU can be more selective and flexible in the way it allocated and uses its development resources. Aid allocations are based on an assessment of a country's needs and performance and include the possibility to regularly adjust financial resources accordingly. In practice, it means that more money can be channelled to "good performers" and that the share of "bad performers" can be reduced.

Aid is allocated to ACP countries in five-year cycles under the Financial Protocol of the Cotonou Agreement. Under the ninth European Development Fund (EDF) (2002–2007) €13.5 billion was allocated to the ACP region.

The 10th EDF (2008–2013) has a significantly increased budget of €22.7 billion, with €5.6 billion earmarked to support regional programmes, especially investments in regional African infrastructure projects through the EU-Africa Partnership on Infrastructure, which was launched in October 2007 in Addis Ababa, Ethiopia, by the African Union Commission (AUC) and the European Commission.

Through the flexibility provided by the Cotonou Agreement, the 10th EDF enables the EU to funnel more aid money (called "incentive amounts") to countries that improve their governance, especially financial, tax and legal systems. While some funds of the 10th EDF have been set aside for unforeseen needs (e.g., related to humanitarian and emergency assistance or to FLEX compensations), most are being programmed in the multi-annual framework for 2008–2013. In the first half of 2012, the programming exercise for the 11th EDF began which for geographic programmes will involve for the first time the European External Action Service as well as the European Commission. As of early 2012 most of the details of the process of programming were contained in internal documents to the European institutions yet independent analysis and a description of the process were provided by the independent foundation the European Centre for Development Policy Management (ECDPM).

== Fight against impunity ==
In recognising that impunity is one of the factors that contribute to cycles of violence and insecurity, the preamble and article 11.7 of the revised Cotonou Agreement include a clear commitment of ACP and EU states to combat impunity and promote justice through the International Criminal Court. Since the International Criminal Court is based on the principle of complementarity, the 2005 revised Cotonou Agreement innovates with obligations to ensure prosecution of the most serious crimes at the national level and through global cooperation. Additionally, article 11.6 of the Agreement includes a clearcut provision that obliges States parties to:

(a) Share experience on the adoption of legal adjustments required to allow for the ratification and implementation of the Rome Statute of the International Criminal Court and (b) Fight against international crime in accordance with international law, giving due regard to the Rome Statute. The parties shall seek to take steps towards ratifying and implementing the Rome Statute and related instruments.

== Revision ==
In accordance with the revision clause, the Cotonou Agreement was twice subject to a revision to enhance the effectiveness and quality of the ACP-EU partnership. The first revision was concluded in Luxembourg on 25 June 2005 and the revised Agreement entered into force on 1 July 2008.

The second revision of the ACP-EU Partnership Agreement was signed during the 35th meeting of the ACP-EU Council of Ministers held in Ouagadougou, Burkina Faso, on 22 June 2010 and entered provisionally into force on 1 November 2010.

=== Samoa Agreement ===
The Cotonou Agreement is expected to be replaced by the Samoa Agreement. This new agreement consists of three separate protocols. These maintain European funding for the Organisation of African, Caribbean and Pacific States secretariat, while giving the EU full authority over where its development funds are issued (the agreement provides the legal basis for European Investment Bank funding outside of the EU), and is intended to ease the repatriation of undocumented migrants. The text of this new arrangement was agreed in April 2021, however its ratification on the EU side was delayed by Hungary and Poland. At a meeting in Samoa in November 2023, 44 ACP states signed the agreement.

== Criticism ==
It has been argued that although the main pillar of the Cotonou Agreement is poverty reduction, aid allocated to Africa under the 9th European Development Fund has had a limited impact on the majority of the poor.
