= Organisation of African, Caribbean and Pacific States =

Intergovernmental organization on sustainable development and poverty reduction

Organisation of African, Caribbean and Pacific States Organisation des États d'Afrique, des Caraïbes et du Pacifique
- Flag

- Secretariat: Brussels, Belgium
- Official languages: English; French

Government
  - Secretary General: Moussa Saleh Batraki
- Establishment: 6 June 1975
- Website www.oacps.org

Caribbean group East and South Africa group Pacific group West African group Southern African group Central African group East Africa group

The Organisation of African, Caribbean and Pacific States (OACPS, French: Organisation des États d'Afrique, des Caraïbes et du Pacifique) is a group of countries in Africa, the Caribbean, and the Pacific Islands that was created by the Georgetown Agreement in 1975. Formerly known as African, Caribbean and Pacific Group of States (ACP), the organisation's main objectives are sustainable development and poverty reduction within its member states, as well as their greater integration into the world's economy. All of the member states, except Cuba, are signatories to the Cotonou Agreement with the European Union.

The Cotonou Agreement (signed in Cotonou, Benin, in June 2000) is the successor to the Lomé Conventions. One of the major differences from the Lomé Convention is that the partnership is extended to new actors such as civil society, private sector, trade unions and local authorities. These will be involved in consultations and planning of national development strategies, provided with access to financial resources and involved in the implementation of programmes.

Many small island developing states are OACPS states; the fourth Lomé Convention was revised in 1995 in Mauritius and gives special attention to island countries in this agreement. Combined the EU and the members of the OACPS represent over 1.5 billion people and more than half of the seats at the United Nations.

== Member states ==
=== Africa ===
The African OACPS countries negotiate in five Economic Partnership Agreements groups (West Africa, Economic and Monetary Community of Central Africa, Southern Africa Development Community, East African Community, Eastern and Southern Africa) with the EU.

"West Africa group" (ECOWAS plus Mauritania and AES or LGA): Benin; Burkina Faso; Cape Verde; Gambia; Ghana; Guinea; Guinea-Bissau; Ivory Coast; Liberia; Mali; Mauritania; Niger; Nigeria; Senegal; Sierra Leone; Togo; "CEMAC plus São Tomé and Príncipe, DR Congo group" (ECCAS related): Cameroon; Central African Republic; Chad; Democratic Republic of the Congo; Republic of the Congo; Equatorial Guinea; Gabon; São Tomé and Príncipe	EAC group: Burundi; Kenya; Rwanda; South Sudan; Tanzania; Uganda; "Eastern and Southern Africa group" (COMESA related): Comoros; Djibouti; Eritrea; Ethiopia; Madagascar; Malawi; Mauritius; Seychelles; Somalia; Sudan; Zambia; Zimbabwe; SADC group: Angola; Botswana; Eswatini; Lesotho; Mozambique; Namibia; South Africa

=== Caribbean ===
All countries of the Caribbean Community (CARICOM) plus Dominican Republic group negotiate in the CARIFORUM Economic Partnership Agreement (EPA) with the European Union (EU). The Caribbean-bloc is sometimes co-represented at EU-LAC (Latin America and the Caribbean).

Antigua and Barbuda; Bahamas; Barbados; Belize; Cuba; Dominica; Dominican Republic; Grenada	Guyana; Haiti; Jamaica; Saint Kitts and Nevis; Saint Lucia; Saint Vincent and the Grenadines; Suriname; Trinidad and Tobago

=== Pacific ===
All developing member states of the Pacific Islands Forum group and Timor-Leste negotiate in the Pacific EPA with the EU.

Fiji; Cook Islands; Kiribati; Marshall Islands; Federated States of Micronesia; Nauru; Niue; Palau	Papua New Guinea; Samoa; Solomon Islands; Timor-Leste; Tonga; Tuvalu; Vanuatu

=== North Atlantic EU OCTs ===
In this region are located the EU overseas countries and territories (OCTs) of Greenland and Saint Pierre and Miquelon, but there are no OACPS states.

=== South Atlantic dependent territories ===
In this region are located the U.K. overseas territories of Saint Helena, Ascension and Tristan da Cunha and Falkland Islands, but there are no OACPS states. Nevertheless, Saint Helena is developing links with the SADC EPA group.

=== Uninhabited territories ===
The uninhabited EU OCT does not participate in regional integration and does not receive development funding from the EU.

- French Southern and Antarctic Territories, located in the Indian Ocean

The uninhabited U.K. overseas territories are not OACPS states and do not receive development funding from the EU.

- British Indian Ocean Territory, located in the Indian Ocean
- South Georgia and South Sandwich Islands, located in the South Atlantic

== Special designations ==
The Cotonou agreement recognises the specific challenges faced by less developed countries, land-locked countries, and islands in their economic development. Therefore, those countries are granted a more favourable treatment than other OACPS member countries. The text of the Cotonou agreement has been updated in 2005 and 2010, but the lists have not, despite the fact that the actual list of LDCs as defined by the United Nations has changed: Cape Verde has graduated from LDC status in December 2007, while Senegal has acquired the status in 2001 and Timor-Leste in 2003. The following lists should thus not be considered as the actual lists of OACPS LDCs and islands (a few islands are also not listed).

Annex VI of the Cotonou agreement lists the following designations:

=== Least-developed OACPS states ===
Angola, Benin, Burkina Faso, Burundi, Cape Verde, the Central African Republic, Chad, Comoros, the Democratic Republic of the Congo, Djibouti, Equatorial Guinea, Eritrea, Ethiopia, Gambia, Guinea, Guinea-Bissau, Haiti, Kiribati, Lesotho, Liberia, Madagascar, Malawi, Mali, Mauritania, Mozambique, Niger, Rwanda, Samoa, São Tomé and Príncipe, Sierra Leone, Solomon Islands, Somalia, Sudan, Tanzania, Tuvalu, Togo, Uganda, Vanuatu, Zambia.

The Least developed OCTs are the following: Anguilla, Mayotte, Montserrat, Saint Helena, Turks and Caicos Islands, Wallis and Futuna, Saint Pierre and Miquelon.

=== Landlocked OACPS states ===
Botswana, Burkina Faso, Burundi, Central African Republic, Chad, Eswatini, Ethiopia, Lesotho, Malawi, Mali, Niger, Rwanda, Uganda, Zambia, Zimbabwe.

=== Island OACPS states ===
Antigua and Barbuda, Bahamas, Barbados, Cape Verde, Comoros, Cuba, Dominica, Dominican Republic, Fiji, Grenada, Haiti, Jamaica, Kiribati, Madagascar, Mauritius, Nauru, Papua New Guinea, Saint Kitts and Nevis, Saint Lucia, Saint Vincent and the Grenadines, Samoa, São Tomé and Príncipe, Seychelles, Solomon Islands, Tonga, Trinidad and Tobago, Tuvalu, Vanuatu.

== Organs ==
- ACP–EU Joint Parliamentary Assembly
- ACP–EU development cooperation
- European Centre for Development Policy Management
- Technical Centre for Agricultural and Rural Cooperation ACP-EU (CTA)

=== Trade and legal framework ===
- EU-ACP Economic Partnership Agreements (EPA) with the ACP countries

== See also ==
- CARIFORUM–United Kingdom Economic Partnership Agreement
- The Courier (ACP-EU) : The magazine of Africa-Caribbean-Pacific and European Union cooperation and relations
- Everything but Arms
