= 2024 French legislative election in Cher =

Following the first round of the 2024 French legislative election on 30 June 2024, runoff elections in each constituency where no candidate received a vote share greater than 50 percent were scheduled for 7 July. Candidates permitted to stand in the runoff elections needed to either come in first or second place in the first round or achieve more than 12.5 percent of the votes of the entire electorate (as opposed to 12.5 percent of the vote share due to low turnout).

== Cher ==
=== 1st constituency ===
Candidate	Party or alliance		First round		Second round	
Candidate	Party or alliance		Votes	%	Votes	%
Ugo Iannuzzi	National Rally		18,100	39.94	19,452	43.18
François Cormier-Bouligeon	Ensemble	Renaissance	14,961	33.01	25,595	56.82
Hugo Lefelle	New Popular Front	Socialist Party	11,432	25.22		
Sylvie Cerveau	Far-left	Lutte Ouvrière	680	1.50		
Sandrine Bellon	Regionalists	Independent	149	0.33		
Total			45,322	100.00	45,047	100.00
Valid votes			45,322	96.52	45,047	94.62
Invalid votes			306	0.65	452	0.95
Blank votes			1,326	2.82	2,108	4.43
Total votes			46,954	100.00	47,607	100.00
Registered voters/turnout			70,401	66.70	70,391	67.63

=== 2nd constituency ===
Candidate	Party or alliance		First round		Second round	
Candidate	Party or alliance		Votes	%	Votes	%
Bastian Duenas	National Rally		17,246	40.56	20,220	49.37
Nicolas Sansu	New Popular Front	Communist Party	12,621	29.68	20,739	50.63
Gabriel Behaghel	Ensemble	Democratic Movement	8,857	20.83		
Philippe Bulteau	Miscellaneous right	Independent	2,705	6.36		
Régis Robin	Far-left	Lutte Ouvrière	580	1.36		
Ludovic Jaulin	Reconquête		508	1.19		
Total			42,517	100.00	40,959	100.00
Valid votes			42,517	96.64	40,959	91.63
Invalid votes			530	1.20	945	2.11
Blank votes			949	2.16	2,795	6.25
Total votes			43,996	100.00	44,699	100.00
Registered voters/turnout			68,476	64.25	68,481	65.27

=== 3rd constituency ===
Candidate	Party or alliance		First round		Second round	
Candidate	Party or alliance		Votes	%	Votes	%
Pierre Gentillet	National Rally		23,501	43.15	25,578	47.21
Loïc Kervran	Ensemble	Horizons	16,991	31.20	28,602	52.79
Emma Moreira	New Popular Front	La France Insoumise	9,334	17.14		
Bénédicte de Choulot	The Republicans		3,178	5.84		
Eric Lougnon	Reconquête		599	1.10		
Eric Bellet	Far-left	Lutte Ouvrière	568	1.04		
Christa Chartier	Sovereigntist right	Debout la France	290	0.53		
Total			54,461	100.00	54,180	100.00
Valid votes			54,461	97.03	54,180	95.59
Invalid votes			450	0.80	619	1.09
Blank votes			1,215	2.16	1,883	3.32
Total votes			56,126	100.00	56,682	100.00
Registered voters/turnout			83,645	67.10	83,666	67.75
