= Paul Collowald =

French civil servant and journalist (1923–2025)

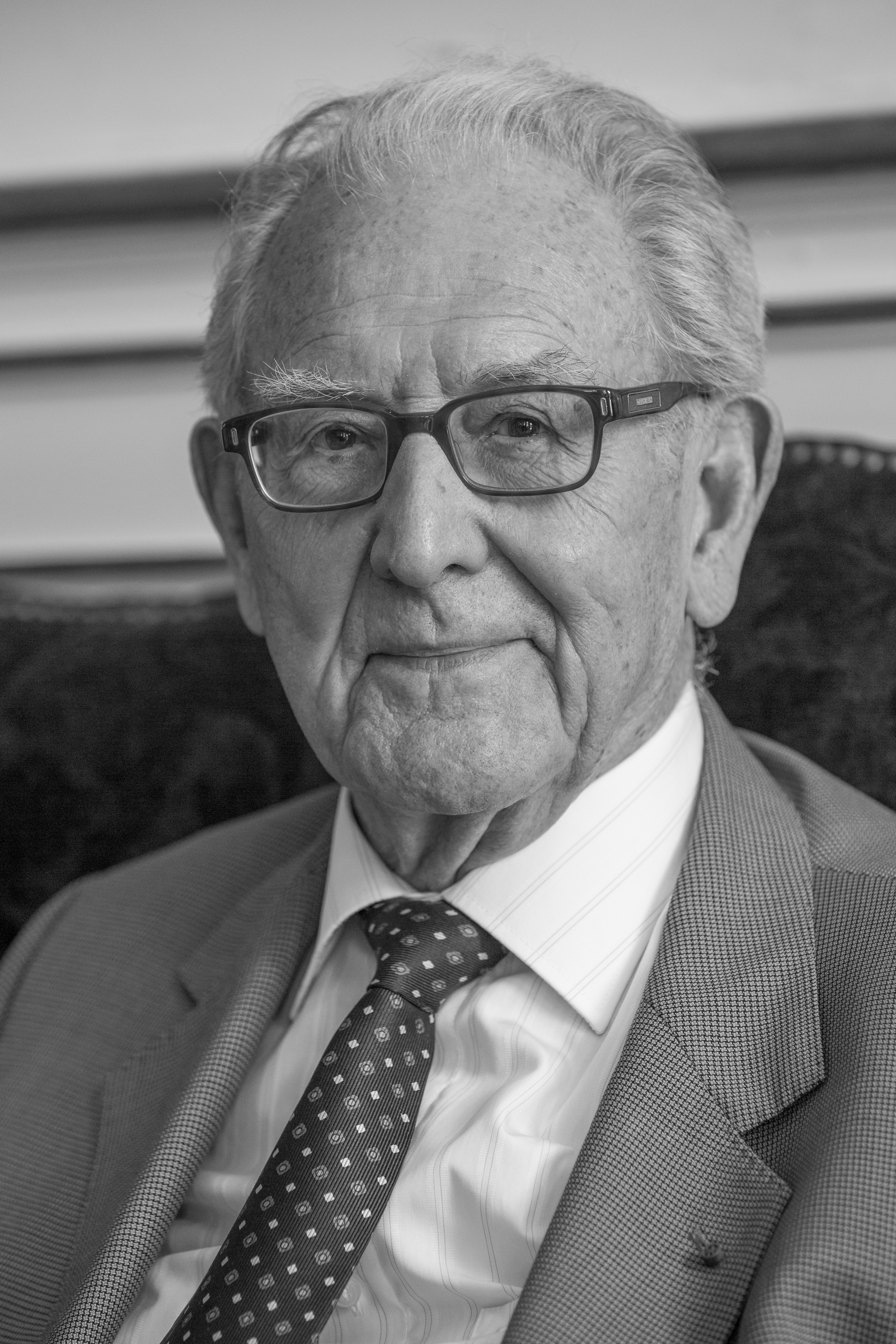
- Collowald in 2013
- Born: 24 June 1923; Wissembourg, France
- Died: 8 July 2025 (aged 102); Brussels, Belgium
- Occupations: Civil servant Journalist

Paul Collowald (24 June 1923 – 8 July 2025) was a French civil servant and journalist.

== Life and career ==
Born in Wissembourg on 24 June 1923, Collowald made his professional debut in 1946 with the newspaper Le Nouvel Alsacien. In 1952, he joined Le Monde as its Strasbourg correspondent for European and regional affairs. The city had become the seat of the Council of Europe, the European Coal and Steel Community, the Treaty establishing the European Defence Community, and the European Political Community. His career in the European sphere began in 1958 in Luxembourg with the High Authority of the European Coal and Steel Community and Euratom. The following year, he moved to Brussels at the request of Robert Marjolin, Vice-President of the Hallstein Commission, to work as his spokesperson. In 1973, he became director-general of the European Commission's Directorate for Information. He worked for the Commission for 25 years before moving to the European Parliament, working as President Pierre Pflimlin's cabinet director.

Collowald died in the Brussels region on 8 July 2025, at the age of 102.

== Functions and mandates ==
- Honorary president of the Association Robert Schuman
- Vice-President of the Centre européen Robert Schuman
- Member of the Conseil de la Fondation Jean Monnet

== Biographies and memoirs ==
- J'ai vu naître l'Europe : De Strasbourg à Bruxelles le parcours d'un pionnier de la construction européenne (2014)
- Paul Collowald, pionnier d'une Europe à unir. Une vie à dépasser les frontières (2018)

== Publications ==
- "D'azur et de joie: Contribution à l'histoire du drapeau et de l'hymne de l'Europe" (1999)
- De la Déclaration Schuman (9 mai 1950) à la Déclaration de Laeken (15 décembre 2001) : Les mots qui font et défont l'Europe (2002)
- Pierre Pflimlin, Alsacien et Européen (with Alain Howiller, 2007)
- "14 juillet 1946 : Winston Churchill à Metz" (2016)

== Honors and awards ==
- Officer of the Order of Legion of Honour
