= European Commissioner for Preparedness and Crisis Management =

Member of the EU Commission

European Commissioner Equality; Preparedness and Crisis Management
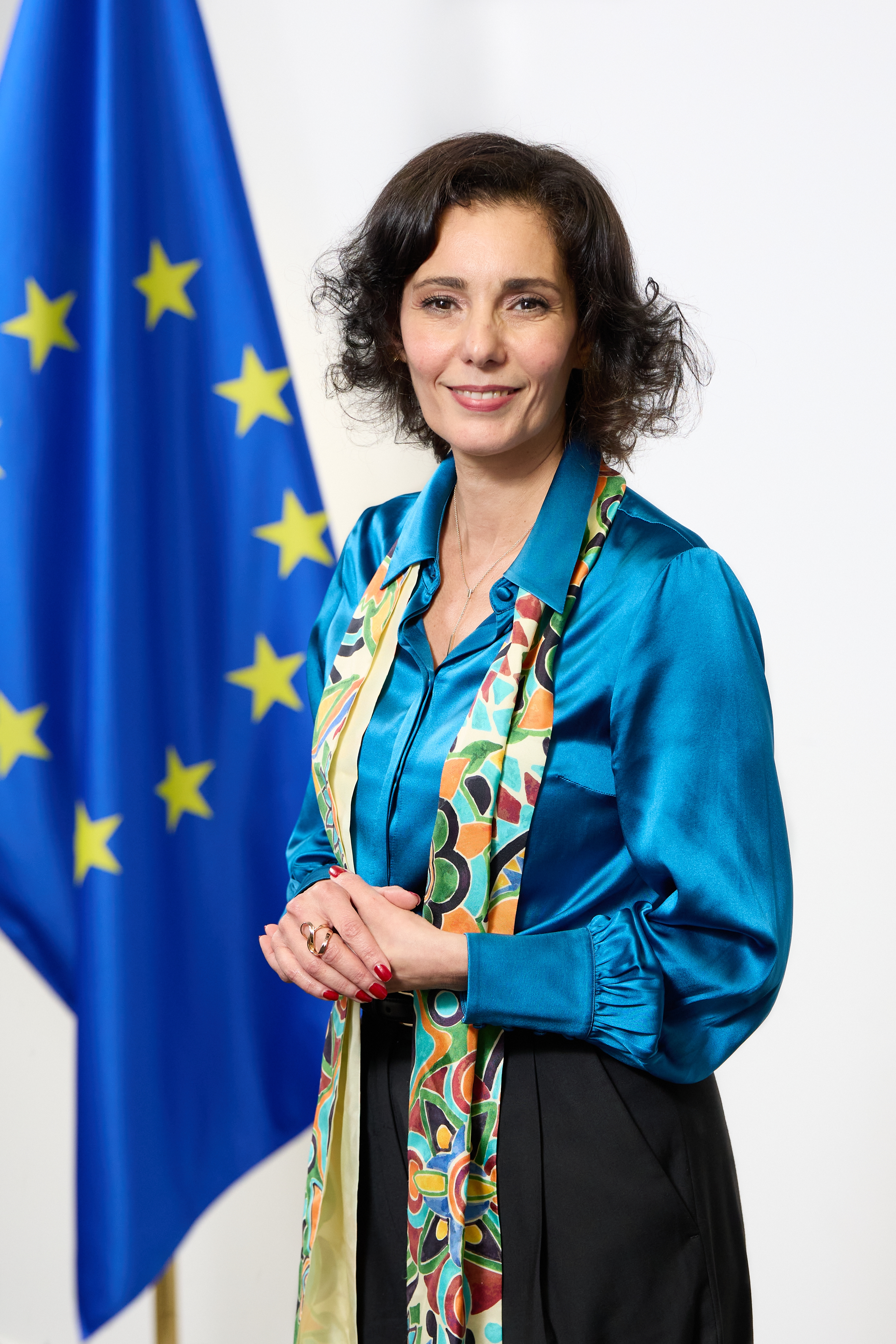
- Incumbent; Hadja Lahbib since 1 December 2024
- Appointer: President of the European Commission
- Inaugural holder: Robert Lemaignen
- Formation: 1958

The European Commissioner for Preparedness and Crisis Management is a member of the European Commission. The portfolios is currently held by Hadja Lahbib.

Hadja Lahbib also serves as Commissioner for Equality.

The Civil Protection mechanism of the Commission means that the position covers the European Union's disaster response. It provides support if a member state requests aid after a natural disaster. This function has adopted a wider scope in recent years as the Commission increasingly becomes an instrument of support around the world. For example, the Commission provided aid to Morocco when the country was hit by an earthquake in February 2004. More than 1,000 aid workers were also dispatched to the United States after 11 September 2001 terrorist attack.

== Louis Michel as commissioner ==
After the Israeli-Lebanese conflict in 2006 the Commissioner visited Lebanon and called for €30 million to repair the damage there. The Parliament's development committee was cautious though about the expenditure and he was also criticised for his slow response with one MEP comparing him to "a fireman who arrives at the scene after the fire has gone out". In the same debate MEPs attacked the Commissioner for "appearing partial in the Congolese elections" in describing Joseph Kabila as "the hope of Congo". Michel responded by saying he would have said the same about any candidate in the democratic elections.

Louis Michel has caused some mild controversy in 2007 among MEPs when it became known that he is to take leave from his work to compete in Belgian elections. Generally Commissioners are meant to remain above national politics and the European Parliament's development committee asked the Parliament's legal service to assess if his participation violates the treaties. During his absence (12 May 2007 onwards), Commissioner Rehn took over his duties.

== European Medical Corps ==
The European Medical Corps (EMC) is a civilian incident response team that was launched on 15 February 2016 by the European Union to provide an emergency response force to deal with outbreaks of epidemic disease anywhere in the world. The EMC was formed after the 2014 Ebola outbreak in West Africa when the WHO was criticized for a slow and insufficient response in the early stages of the Ebola outbreak.

The framework for the European Medical Corps is part of the EU Civil Protection Mechanism's new European Emergency Response Capacity (otherwise known as the 'voluntary pool').

The EMC is part of the emergency response capacity of European countries. Teams from nine EU member states—Belgium, Luxembourg, Spain, Germany, the Czech Republic, France, the Netherlands, Finland, and Sweden – are available for deployment in an emergency. The EMC consists of medical teams, public health teams, mobile biosafety laboratories, medical evacuation capacities, experts in public health and medical assessment and coordination, and technical and logistics support. Any country in need of assistance can make a request to the Emergency Response Coordination Centre, part of the European Commission's Humanitarian Aid and Civil Protection department.

The first deployment of the EMC was announced by the European Commissioner for Humanitarian Aid and Civil Protection on 12 May 2016, a response to the outbreak of yellow fever in Angola in 2016.

== List of Commissioners ==
#	Name	Country	Period	Commission
1	Robert Lemaignen	France	1958–1962	Hallstein Commission
2	Henri Rochereau	France	1962–1970	Hallstein Commission, Rey Commission
3	Jean-François Deniau	France	1967–1973	Rey Commission, Malfatti Commission, Mansholt Commission
4	Claude Cheysson	France	1973–1981	Ortoli Commission, Jenkins Commission, Thorn Commission
5	Edgard Pisani	France	1981–1985	Thorn Commission
6	Lorenzo Natali	Italy	1985–1989	Delors Commission I
7	Manuel Marín	Spain	1989–1995	Delors Commission II & III
8	João de Deus Pinheiro	Portugal	1995–1999	Santer Commission
9	Poul Nielson	Denmark	1999–2004	Prodi Commission
10	Joe Borg	Malta	2004	Prodi Commission
11	Louis Michel	Belgium	2004–2009	Barroso Commission I
12	Karel De Gucht	Belgium	2009–2010	Barroso Commission I
13	Kristalina Georgieva	Bulgaria	2010–2014	Barroso Commission II
14	Christos Stylianides	Cyprus	2014–2019	Juncker Commission
15	Janez Lenarčič	Slovenia	2019–2024	Von der Leyen Commission
16	Hadja Lahbib	Belgium	2024–present	Von der Leyen Commission II

== See also ==
- ACP-EU Development Cooperation
- ECHO
- EuropeAid Co-operation Office
- European Development Fund
