= Cher's 1st constituency =

Constituency of the National Assembly of France

- Constituency for the National Assembly
- Boundary of Cher's 1st constituency in Cher

- Location of Cher within France
- Department: Cher
- Region: Centre-Val de Loire
- Population: 99,542 (2013)
- Electorate: 72,563 (2017)

Current constituency
- Deputy: François Cormier-Bouligeon
- Political party: RE
- Parliamentary group: RE

Cher's 1st constituency is one of three French legislative constituencies in the department of Cher. It is currently represented by François Cormier-Bouligeon of Renaissance (RE).

== Historic representation ==
| Legislature | Start of mandate | End of mandate | Deputy | Party |
|---|---|---|---|---|
| 1st | 9 December 1958 | 9 October 1962 | Raymond Boisdé | CNI |
| 2nd | 6 December 1962 | 2 April 1967 | Raymond Boisdé | RI |
| 3rd | 3 April 1967 | 30 May 1968 | Raymond Boisdé | RI |
| 4th | 11 July 1968 | 1 April 1973 | Raymond Boisdé | RI |
| 5th | 2 April 1973 | 2 April 1978 | Raymond Boisdé | RI |
| 6th | 3 April 1978 | 6 May 1978 | Jean-François Deniau | UDF |
| 6th | 7 May 1978 | 22 May 1981 | Henri Moulle | UDF |
| 7th | 2 July 1981 | 1 April 1986 | Jacques Rimbault | PCF |
| 8th | 2 April 1986 | 14 May 1988 | Proportional representation | |
| 9th | 23 June 1988 | 1 April 1993 | Jean-François Deniau | UDF |
| 10th | 2 April 1993 | 21 April 1997 | Jean-François Deniau | UDF |
| 11th | 12 June 1997 | 18 June 2002 | Yves Fromion | RPR |
| 12th | 19 June 2002 | 19 June 2007 | Yves Fromion | UMP |
| 13th | 20 June 2007 | 19 June 2012 | Yves Fromion | UMP |
| 14th | 20 June 2012 | 20 June 2017 | Yves Fromion | UMP |
| 15th | 21 June 2017 | 21 June 2022 | François Cormier-Bouligeon | LREM |
| 16th | 22 June 2022 | 9 June 2024 | François Cormier-Bouligeon | RE |
| 17th | 7 July 2024 | ongoing | François Cormier-Bouligeon | RE |

== Elections ==
=== 2024 ===
| Candidate | Party | Alliance | First round | | | Second round | | |
| Candidate | Party | Alliance | Votes | % | +/– | Votes | % | +/– |
|---|---|---|---|---|---|---|---|---|
| Ugo Iannuzzi | RN | | 18,100 | 39.94 | +17.99 | 19,452 | 43.18 | new |
| François Cormier-Bouligeon | RE | Ensemble | 14,961 | 33.01 | +0.87 | 25,595 | 56.82 | -0.32 |
| Hugo Lefelle | PS | NFP | 11,432 | 25.22 | +1.02 | withdrew | | |
| Sylvie Cerveau | LO | | 680 | 1.50 | -0.26 | | | |
| Sandrine Bellon | DIV | | 149 | 0.33 | new | | | |
| Votes | | | 45,322 | 100.00 | | 45,047 | 100.00 | |
| Valid votes | | | 45,322 | 96.52 | -0.81 | 45,047 | 94.62 | +4.88 |
| Blank votes | | | 1,326 | 2.82 | +0.67 | 2,108 | 4.43 | -3.39 |
| Null votes | | | 306 | 0.65 | +0.13 | 452 | 0.95 | 1.49 |
| Turnout | | | 46,954 | 66.70 | +16.78 | 47,607 | 67.63 | +20.72 |
| Abstentions | | | 23,447 | 33.30 | -16.78 | 22,784 | 32.37 | -20.72 |
| Registered voters | | | 70,401 | | | 70,391 | | |
| Result | | | RE HOLD | | | | | |

=== 2022 ===
Legislative Election 2022: Cher's 1st constituency
| Party | Candidate | Votes | % | ±% |
|---|---|---|---|---|
| LREM (Ensemble) | François Cormier-Bouligeon | 11,113 | 32.14 | -4.16 |
| PS (NUPÉS) | Alex Charpentier | 8,370 | 24.20 | +0.49 |
| RN | Julie Apricena | 7,591 | 21.95 | +8.02 |
| LR (UDC) | David Dallois | 4,669 | 13.50 | −7.18 |
| REC | Adrien-Laurent Bernelle | 1,660 | 4.80 | N/A |
| LO | Sylvie Cerveau | 607 | 1.76 | +0.47 |
| LP (UPF) | Karine Bèringer | 571 | 1.65 | N/A |
| Turnout | | 34,581 | 49.92 | −0.78 |
2nd round result
| LREM (Ensemble) | François Cormier-Bouligeon | 17,117 | 57.14 | +0.93 |
| PS (NUPÉS) | Alex Charpentier | 12,840 | 42.86 | N/A |
| Turnout | | 29,957 | 46.91 | +3.19 |
| LREM hold | | | | |

=== 2017 ===
| Candidate | Label | First round | | Second round | |
| Candidate | Label | Votes | % | Votes | % |
|---|---|---|---|---|---|
| François Cormier-Bouligeon | REM | 12,977 | 36.30 | 15,397 | 56.21 |
| Wladimir d'Ormesson | LR | 7,393 | 20.68 | 11,996 | 43.79 |
| Jean-René Coueille | FN | 4,981 | 13.93 | | |
| Frédéric Renard | FI | 4,793 | 13.41 | | |
| Céline Bezoui | PS | 2,501 | 7.00 | | |
| Françoise Pouzet | ECO | 1,181 | 3.30 | | |
| Laurent Sorcelle | UDI | 1,095 | 3.06 | | |
| Sylvie Cerveau | EXG | 463 | 1.29 | | |
| Romain Guillaume | DIV | 369 | 1.03 | | |
| Votes | | 35,753 | 100.00 | 27,393 | 100.00 |
| Valid votes | | 35,753 | 97.20 | 27,393 | 86.34 |
| Blank votes | | 844 | 2.29 | 3,446 | 10.86 |
| Null votes | | 186 | 0.51 | 889 | 2.80 |
| Turnout | | 36,783 | 50.70 | 31,728 | 43.72 |
| Abstentions | | 35,762 | 49.30 | 40,835 | 56.28 |
| Registered voters | | 72,545 | | 72,563 | |
Source: Ministry of the Interior

=== 2012 ===
2012 legislative election in Cher's 1st constituency
| Candidate | Party | First round | | Second round | |
| Candidate | Party | Votes | % | Votes | % |
|---|---|---|---|---|---|
| Yves Fromion | UMP | 14,546 | 33.89% | 21,058 | 50.52% |
| Céline Bezoui | PS | 13,331 | 31.06% | 20,622 | 49.48% |
| Danielle Avon | FN | 5,255 | 12.24% | | |
| Yannick Bedin | FG | 4,297 | 10.01% | | |
| David Dallois | PLD | 2,545 | 5.93% | | |
| Philippe Redois | EELV | 1,061 | 2.47% | | |
| Philippe Bensac | NC | 991 | 2.31% | | |
| Jérôme Leroy | DLR | 389 | 0.91% | | |
| Sylvie Cerveau | LO | 329 | 0.77% | | |
| Marie Avril | NPA | 174 | 0.41% | | |
| Valid votes | | 42,918 | 98.21% | 41,680 | 96.20% |
| Spoilt and null votes | | 783 | 1.79% | 1,648 | 3.80% |
| Votes cast / turnout | | 43,701 | 59.36% | 43,328 | 58.89% |
| Abstentions | | 29,918 | 40.64% | 30,242 | 41.11% |
| Registered voters | | 73,619 | 100.00% | 73,570 | 100.00% |

=== 2007 ===
Legislative Election 2007: Cher's 1st constituency
| Party | Candidate | Votes | % | ±% |
|---|---|---|---|---|
| UMP | Yves Fromion | 20,505 | 46.35 | |
| PS | Irène Felix | 10,921 | 24.69 | |
| MoDem | Alain Tanton | 3,604 | 8.15 | |
| PCF | Yannick Bedin | 2,335 | 5.28 | |
| FN | Jean d'Ogny | 2,187 | 4.94 | |
| LV | Roger Ledoux | 1,411 | 3.19 | |
| Others | N/A | 3,276 | | |
| Turnout | | 45,170 | 60.22 | |
2nd round result
| UMP | Yves Fromion | 24,193 | 55.92 | |
| PS | Irène Felix | 19,070 | 44.08 | |
| Turnout | | 44,617 | 59.49 | |
| UMP hold | | | | |

=== 2002 ===
Legislative Election 2002: Cher's 1st constituency
| Party | Candidate | Votes | % | ±% |
|---|---|---|---|---|
| UMP | Yves Fromion | 20,530 | 43.84 | |
| LV | Roger Ledoux | 11,834 | 25.27 | |
| FN | Jean d'Ogny | 5,626 | 12.01 | |
| DVD | Marie-Christine Fossier | 2,937 | 6.27 | |
| LO | Sylvie Cerveau | 1,527 | 3.26 | |
| CPNT | Gerard Fremion | 1,319 | 2.82 | |
| PR | Jean-Francois Babouin | 1,221 | 2.61 | |
| Others | N/A | 1,833 | | |
| Turnout | | 48,109 | 64.82 | |
2nd round result
| UMP | Yves Fromion | 25,822 | 60.32 | |
| LV | Roger Ledoux | 16,984 | 39.68 | |
| Turnout | | 44,586 | 60.08 | |
| UMP hold | | | | |

=== 1997 ===
Legislative Election 1997: Cher's 1st constituency
| Party | Candidate | Votes | % | ±% |
|---|---|---|---|---|
| RPR | Yves Fromion | 15,646 | 32.83 | |
| PS | Roland Hodel | 9,537 | 20.01 | |
| PCF | Maxime Camuzat | 8,764 | 18.39 | |
| FN | Jean d'Ogny | 6,586 | 13.82 | |
| LO | Sylvie Cerveau | 1,809 | 3.80 | |
| MPF | Yves Roussel | 1,762 | 3.70 | |
| LV | Joel Crotté | 1,361 | 2.86 | |
| GE | Paulin Paris | 1,267 | 2.66 | |
| Others | N/A | 923 | | |
| Turnout | | 50,411 | 68.39 | |
2nd round result
| RPR | Yves Fromion | 25,410 | 50.76 | |
| PS | Roland Hodel | 24,649 | 49.24 | |
| Turnout | | 53,535 | 72.67 | |
| RPR gain from UDF | | | | |
