= Sandrier =

Sandrier is a surname. Notable people with the surname include:

- Jean-Claude Sandrier (born 1945), French politician and former Mayor of Bourges
- Yves Sandrier (1938–1958), Swiss poet and singer
