= Henri Rochereau =

French politician (1908–1999)

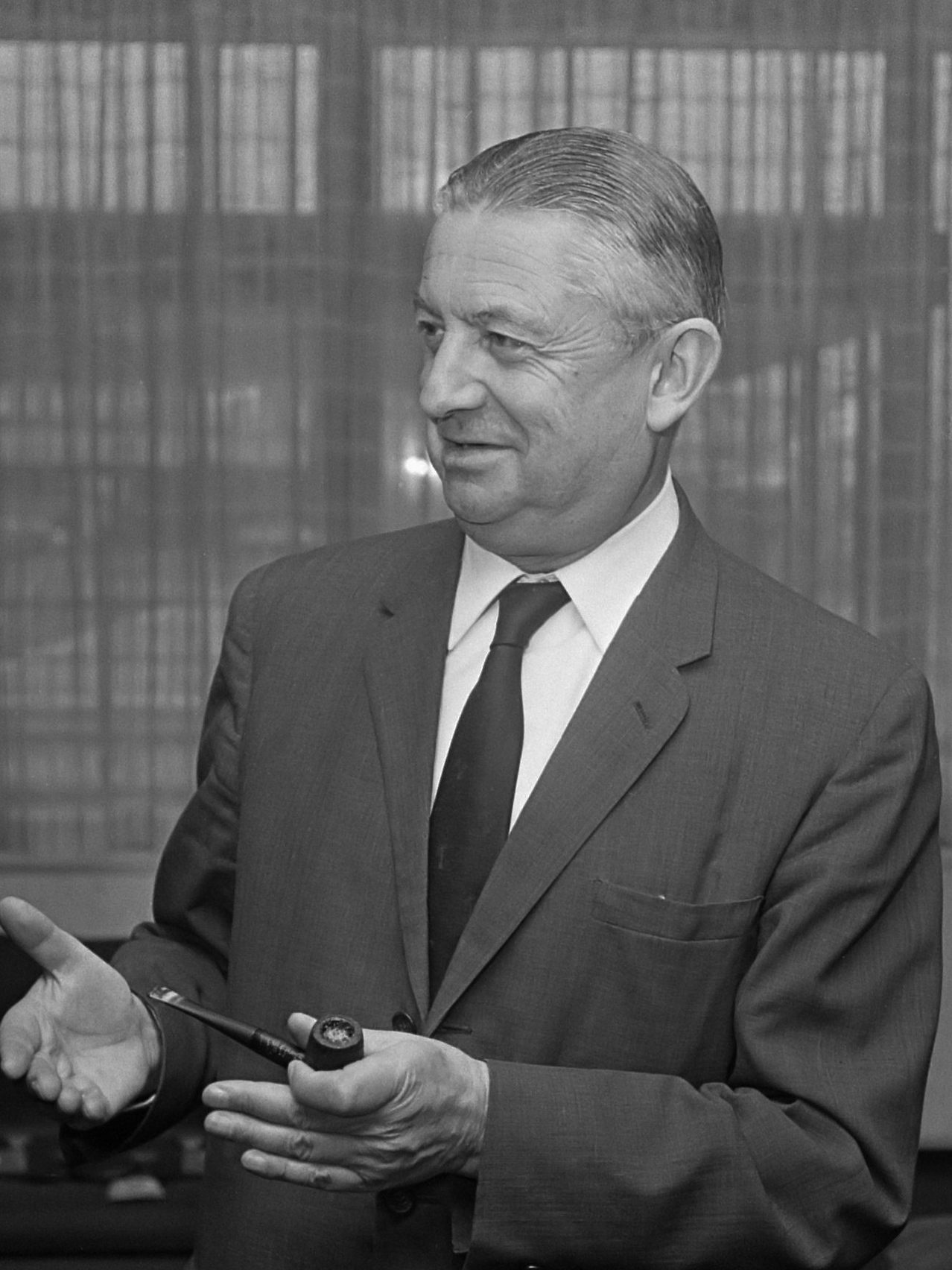
- Rochereau in 1968

European Commissioner for Overseas Development
- In office 9 January 1962 – 30 June 1970
- President: Walter Hallstein; Jean Rey
- Preceded by: Robert Lemaignen
- Succeeded by: Jean-François Deniau (External Relations and Development Aid)

Minister of Agriculture
- In office 27 May 1959 – 24 August 1961
- Prime Minister: Michel Debré
- Preceded by: Roger Houdet
- Succeeded by: Edgard Pisani

Personal details
- Born: 25 March 1908 Chantonnay, France
- Died: 25 January 1999 (aged 90) Vendée, France

Henri Rochereau (25 March 1908 – 25 January 1999) was a French politician and European Commissioner.

Henri was the son of Victor Rochereau, a National Assembly of France député (deputy) for the Vendée department (1914–1942). Henri worked as a solicitors clerk and later in an exporting business.

In the 1988 French presidential election, he supported the right-wing National Front candidate Jean-Marie Le Pen.

== Offices ==
- From 1949 to 1959 he was a member of the Senate of France for the Vendée department and a council leader for the canton of Les Essarts
- From May 1959 to August 1961 Minister for Agriculture in the government of Michel Debré
- From 1962 to 1970 he was Overseas Development Commissioner in the second Hallstein Commission, and from 1967, in the Rey Commission
- From 1970 to 1986 he was President of the association of Large French Ports

== Notes ==
Political offices
Preceded by Roger Houdet	Minister of Agriculture; 1969–1961	Succeeded by Edgard Pisani
Preceded by Robert Marjolin	French European Commissioner; 1962–1970; Served alongside: Robert Marjolin, Raymond Barre	Succeeded by Raymond Barre
Preceded by Robert Lemaignen	French European Commissioner; 1962–1970; Served alongside: Robert Marjolin, Raymond Barre	Succeeded by Jean-François Deniau as European Commissioner for External Relations and Development Aid
Preceded by Robert Lemaignen	European Commissioner for Overseas Development; 1962–1970	Succeeded by Jean-François Deniau as European Commissioner for External Relations and Development Aid
