= Cher's 2nd constituency =

Constituency of the National Assembly of France

- Constituency for the National Assembly
- Boundary of Cher's 2nd constituency in Cher

- Location of Cher within France
- Department: Cher
- Region: Centre-Val de Loire
- Population: 95,442 (2013)
- Electorate: 70,141 (2017)

Current constituency
- Deputy: Nicolas Sansu
- Political party: PCF
- Parliamentary group: GDR

Cher's 2nd constituency is one of three French legislative constituencies in the department of Cher. It is currently represented by Nicolas Sansu of the Communist Party (PCF).

== Historic representation ==
Legislature	Start of mandate	End of mandate	Deputy	Party
1st	9 December 1958	9 October 1962	Jean Boinvilliers	UNR
2nd	6 December 1962	2 April 1967	Jean Boinvilliers	UNR
3rd	3 April 1967	30 May 1968	Jean Boinvilliers	UD-V^{e}
4th	11 July 1968	1 April 1973	Jean Boinvilliers	UDR
5th	2 April 1973	2 April 1978	Jean Boinvilliers	UDR
6th	3 April 1978	22 May 1981	Jean Boinvilliers	RPR
7th	2 July 1981	1 April 1986	Jean Rousseau	PS
8th	2 April 1986	14 May 1988	Proportional representation	
9th	23 June 1988	1 April 1993	Jacques Rimbault	PCF
10th	2 April 1993	21 April 1997	Franck Thomas-Richard	UDF
11th	12 June 1997	18 June 2002	Jean-Claude Sandrier	PCF
12th	19 June 2002	19 June 2007	Jean-Claude Sandrier	PCF
13th	20 June 2007	19 June 2012	Jean-Claude Sandrier	PCF
14th	20 June 2012	20 June 2017	Nicolas Sansu	PCF
15th	21 June 2017	21 June 2022	Nadia Essayan	MoDem
16th	22 June 2022	9 June 2024	Nicolas Sansu	PCF
17th	7 July 2024	ongoing	Nicolas Sansu	PCF

== Elections ==
=== 2024 ===
Candidate	Party	Alliance	First round			Second round		
Candidate	Party	Alliance	Votes	%	+/–	Votes	%	+/–
Bastian Duenas	RN		17,246	40.56	+17.57	20,220	49.37	+3.74
Nicolas Sansu	PCF	NFP	12,621	29.68	-2.68	20,739	50.63	-3.74
Gabriel Behaghel	MoDEM	Ensemble	8,857	20.83	-1.77	withdrew		
Philippe Bulteau	DVD		2,705	6.36	new			
Régis Robin	LO		580	1.36	-0.08			
Ludovic Jaulin	REC		508	1.19	-2.23			
Votes			42,517	100.00		40,959	100.00	
Valid votes			42,517	96.64	-0.94	40,959	91.63	+4.41
Blank votes			949	2.16	+0.41	2,795	6.25	-3.34
Null votes			530	1.20	+0.53	945	2.11	-1.09
Turnout			43,996	64.25	+16.88	44,699	65.27	+21.07
Abstentions			24,480	35.75	-16.88	23,782	34.73	-21.07
Registered voters			68,476			68,481		
Result			PCF HOLD					

=== 2022 ===
Legislative Election 2022: Cher's 2nd constituency
Party	Candidate	Votes	%	±%
PCF (NUPÉS)	Nicolas Sansu	10,300	32.36	+1.21
RN	Christine Poly	7,317	22.99	+13.57
MoDem (Ensemble)	Nadia Essayan	7,193	22.60	−10.66
LR (UDC)	Adrien Baert	3,912	12.29	+1.49
REC	Mathilde Patte-Suchetet	1,088	3.42	N/A
Others	N/A	2,022	-	−
Turnout		31,832	47.37	−0.15
2nd round result
PCF (NUPÉS)	Nicolas Sansu	14,433	54.37	+6.94
RN	Christine Poly	12,113	45.63	N/A
Turnout		26,546	44.20	+0.80
PCF gain from MoDem				

=== 2017 ===
Candidate	Label	First round		Second round	
Candidate	Label	Votes	%	Votes	%
Nadia Essayan	MoDem	10,794	33.26	14,366	52.57
Nicolas Sansu	PCF	7,919	24.40	12,962	47.43
Martine Raimbault	FN	5,328	16.42		
Sophie Bertrand	LR	4,471	13.78		
Agnès Sinsoulier-Bigot	PS	1,216	3.75		
Marie-Thérèse Petit	ECO	974	3.00		
Richard Carton	DIV	625	1.93		
Régis Robin	EXG	520	1.60		
Charly Perragin	DIV	374	1.15		
Carole Sicot	DIV	234	0.72		
Votes		32,455	100.00	27,328	100.00
Valid votes		32,455	97.40	27,328	89.77
Blank votes		645	1.94	2,203	7.24
Null votes		220	0.66	912	3.00
Turnout		33,320	47.52	30,443	43.40
Abstentions		36,804	52.48	39,698	56.60
Registered voters		70,124		70,141	
Source: Ministry of the Interior

=== 2012 ===
2012 legislative election in Cher's 2nd constituency
Candidate	Party	First round		Second round	
Candidate	Party	Votes	%	Votes	%
Nicolas Sansu	FG	10,958	28.94%	15,742	100.00%
Agnès Sinsoulier-Bigot	PS	10,202	26.95%		
Maria Crespel	UMP	7,553	19.95%		
François Scheid	FN	6,222	16.43%		
Marie-José Lechelon	EELV	1,039	2.74%		
Bernadette Guille	PR	1,037	2.74%		
Régis Robin	LO	439	1.16%		
Michel Lasserre		412	1.09%		
Valid votes		37,862	97.51%	15,742	66.87%
Spoilt and null votes		965	2.49%	7,800	33.13%
Votes cast / turnout		38,827	55.37%	23,542	33.48%
Abstentions		31,301	44.63%	46,778	66.52%
Registered voters		70,128	100.00%	70,320	100.00%

Agnès Sinsoulier-Bigot, the socialist party candidate withdrew from the election before the second round.

=== 2007 ===
Legislative Election 2007: Cher's 2nd constituency
Party	Candidate	Votes	%	±%
UMP	Franck Thomas-Richard	13,929	34.46	
PCF	Jean-Claude Sandrier	12,611	31.20	
PS	Marie-Hélène Bodin	5,361	13.26	
MoDem	Nadia Essayan	2,809	6.95	
FN	Françoise Merlin	2,012	4.98	
LV	Bérengère Esnault	878	2.17	
Others	N/A	2,826		
Turnout		41,324	58.89	
2nd round result
PCF	Jean-Claude Sandrier	23,318	57.37	
UMP	Franck Thomas-Richard	17,324	42.63	
Turnout		42,230	60.18	
PCF hold				

=== 2002 ===
Legislative Election 2002: Cher's 2nd constituency
Party	Candidate	Votes	%	±%
PCF	Jean-Claude Sandrier	16,027	38.64	
UMP	Franck Thomas-Richard	12,585	30.34	
FN	Francoise Merlin	4,543	10.95	
PRG	Samir Bahlis	3,437	8.29	
MPF	Henri Deffontaines	1,181	2.85	
LO	Regis Robin	926	2.23	
CPNT	Claude Affouard	894	2.16	
Others	N/A	1,890		
Turnout		42,669	62.12	
2nd round result
PCF	Jean-Claude Sandrier	21,584	55.65	
UMP	Franck Thomas-Richard	17,202	44.35	
Turnout		40,791	59.31	
PCF hold				

=== 1997 ===
Legislative Election 1997: Cher's 2nd constituency
Party	Candidate	Votes	%	±%
PCF	Jean-Claude Sandrier	12,795	29.77	
UDF	Franck Thomas-Richard	11,791	27.43	
PS	Marie-Hélène Bodin	7,005	16.30	
FN	François Scheid	6,494	15.11	
LO	Régis Robin	2,243	5.22	
MPF	Françoise Tessiot	1,441	3.35	
MRC	Claude Débéba	1,209	2.81	
DVD	Christian Raffestin	2	0.01	
Turnout		45,672	68.12	
2nd round result
PCF	Jean-Claude Sandrier	25,993	57.69	
UDF	Franck Thomas-Richard	19,066	42.31	
Turnout		48,331	72.11	
PCF gain from UDF				
