= 13th National Assembly =

13th National Assembly may refer to:

- 13th National Assembly of France
- 13th National Assembly of Pakistan
- 13th National Assembly of South Korea
- 13th National Assembly of Vietnam
