= Departmental Council of Cher =

Departmental legislature in France

Departmental Council of Cher Conseil départemental du Cher

Leadership
- President: Jacques Fleury, LR since 1 July 2021

Structure
- Seats: 38
- Political groups: Government (24): DVD (11); LR (11); UDI (2); Opposition (14): PS (8); PCF (5); DVG (1); www.departement18.fr

The Departmental Council of Cher (French: Conseil Départemental du Cher) is the deliberative assembly of the Cher department in the region of Centre-Val de Loire. It consists of 38 members (general councilors) from 19 cantons and its headquarters are in Bourges.

The President of the General Council is Jacques Fleury.

== Vice-Presidents ==
The President of the Departmental Council is assisted by 11 vice-presidents chosen from among the departmental advisers. Each of them has a delegation of authority.

List of vice-presidents of the Cher Departmental Council (as of 2021)
Order	Name	Party	Canton	Delegation
1st	Patrick Barnier	UDI	Trouy	Regional planning (broadband, DSI, agriculture) and higher education
2nd	Anne Cassier	UCD	Aubigny-sur-Nère	Education, youth and international solidarity
3rd	Emmanuel Riotte	UCD	Saint-Amand-Montrond	Housing and housing policy
4th	Sophie Bertrand	UD	Mehun-sur-Yèvre	Childhood, family and disability
5th	Daniel Fourré	UCD	Châteaumeillant	Roads and buildings
6th	Béatrice Damade	UCD	Saint-Martin-d'Auxigny	Tourism and promotion of the territory
7th	Philippe Charrette	UD	Chârost	Finance, budget rapporteur and public order
8th	Bénédicte de Choulot	DVD	Avord	Social Affairs (elderly) and inclusion
9th	Richard Boudet	DVD	Saint-Doulchard	Sport and community life
10th	Sophie Chestier	DVD	Sancerre	Culture and heritage
11th	Didier Brugère	DVD	Dun-sur-Auron	Environment and water
