= Jean-François Deniau =

French politician (1928–2007)

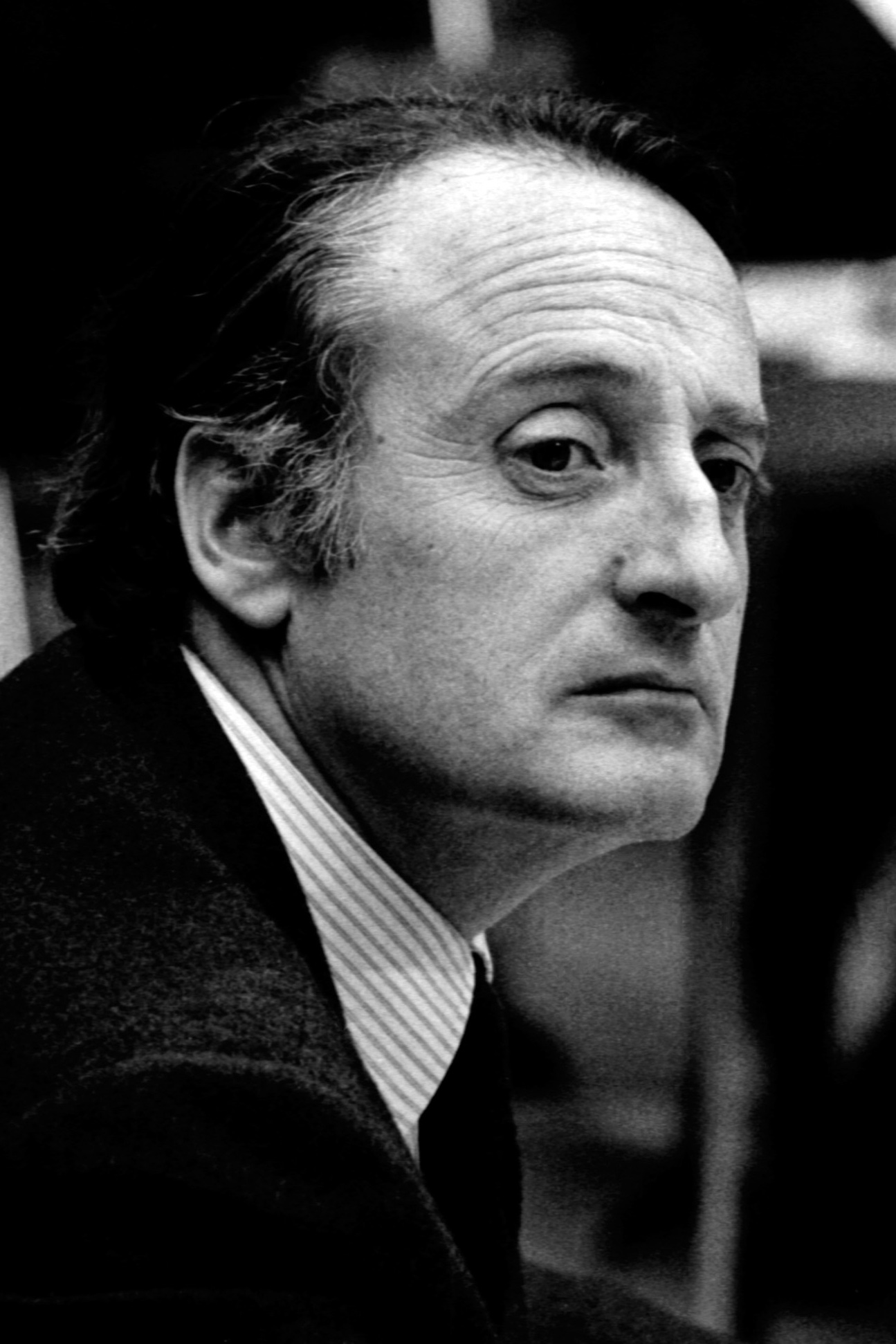
- Deniau in 1973

Member of the Académie française (seat 36)
- In office 9 April 1992 – 24 January 2007
- Preceded by: Jacques Soustelle
- Succeeded by: Philippe Beaussant

President of the General Council of Cher
- In office 31 March 1994 – 27 March 1998
- Preceded by: Jacques Genton
- Succeeded by: Serge Vinçon

Member of the Chamber of Deputies for Cher
- In office 3 April 1978 – 6 May 1978; 2 April 1986 – 14 May 1988; 23 June 1988 – 21 April 1997
- Preceded by: Raymond Boisdé (1978); Jacques Rimbault (1986)
- Succeeded by: Henri Moulle (1978); Yves Fromion (1997)

Minister Delegate to Administrative Reforms
- In office 3 April 1978 – 2 October 1980
- President: Valéry Giscard d'Estaing
- Prime Minister: Raymond Barre
- Preceded by: Jean-Jacques Servan-Schreiber (indirectly)
- Succeeded by: Catherine Lalumière

Minister Delegate to External Trade
- In office 3 April 1978 – 2 October 1980
- President: Valéry Giscard d'Estaing
- Prime Minister: Raymond Barre
- Preceded by: André Rossi
- Succeeded by: Michel Cointat

Deputy Minister to the Minister of Foreign Affairs
- In office 26 September 1977 – 31 March 1978
- President: Valéry Giscard d'Estaing
- Prime Minister: Raymond Barre
- Preceded by: Pierre-Christian Taittinger
- Succeeded by: Olivier Stirn

Deputy Minister to the Minister of Agriculture
- In office 27 February 1974 – 12 January 1976
- President: Valéry Giscard d'Estaing
- Prime Minister: Jacques Chirac
- Preceded by: Position created
- Succeeded by: Pierre Méhaignerie

Deputy Minister to the Minister of Foreign Affairs
- In office 12 April 1973 – 27 February 1974
- President: Georges Pompidou
- Prime Minister: Pierre Messmer
- Preceded by: André Bettencourt
- Succeeded by: Jean de Lipkowski

European Commissioner for International Partnerships
- In office 22 March 1972 – 5 January 1973
- President: Sicco Mansholt
- Preceded by: Position created
- Succeeded by: Claude Cheysson

European Commissioner for External Relations
- In office 1 July 1970 – 21 March 1972
- President: Franco Maria Malfatti
- Preceded by: Himself
- Succeeded by: Ralf Dahrendorf

European Commissioner for Trade
- In office 7 July 1967 – 30 June 1970
- President: Jean Rey
- Preceded by: Jean Rey
- Succeeded by: Ralf Dahrendorf

Personal details
- Born: 31 October 1928 Paris, France
- Died: 24 January 2007 (aged 78) Paris, France
- Party: Republican; UDF (until 1998)
- Education: Sciences Po, ÉNA

Jean-François Deniau (French pronunciation: [ʒɑ̃ fʁɑ̃swa dənjo]; 31 October 1928 – 24 January 2007) was a French politician, diplomat, essayist and novelist. Until 1998, he was a member of the Union for French Democracy (UDF).

== Biography ==
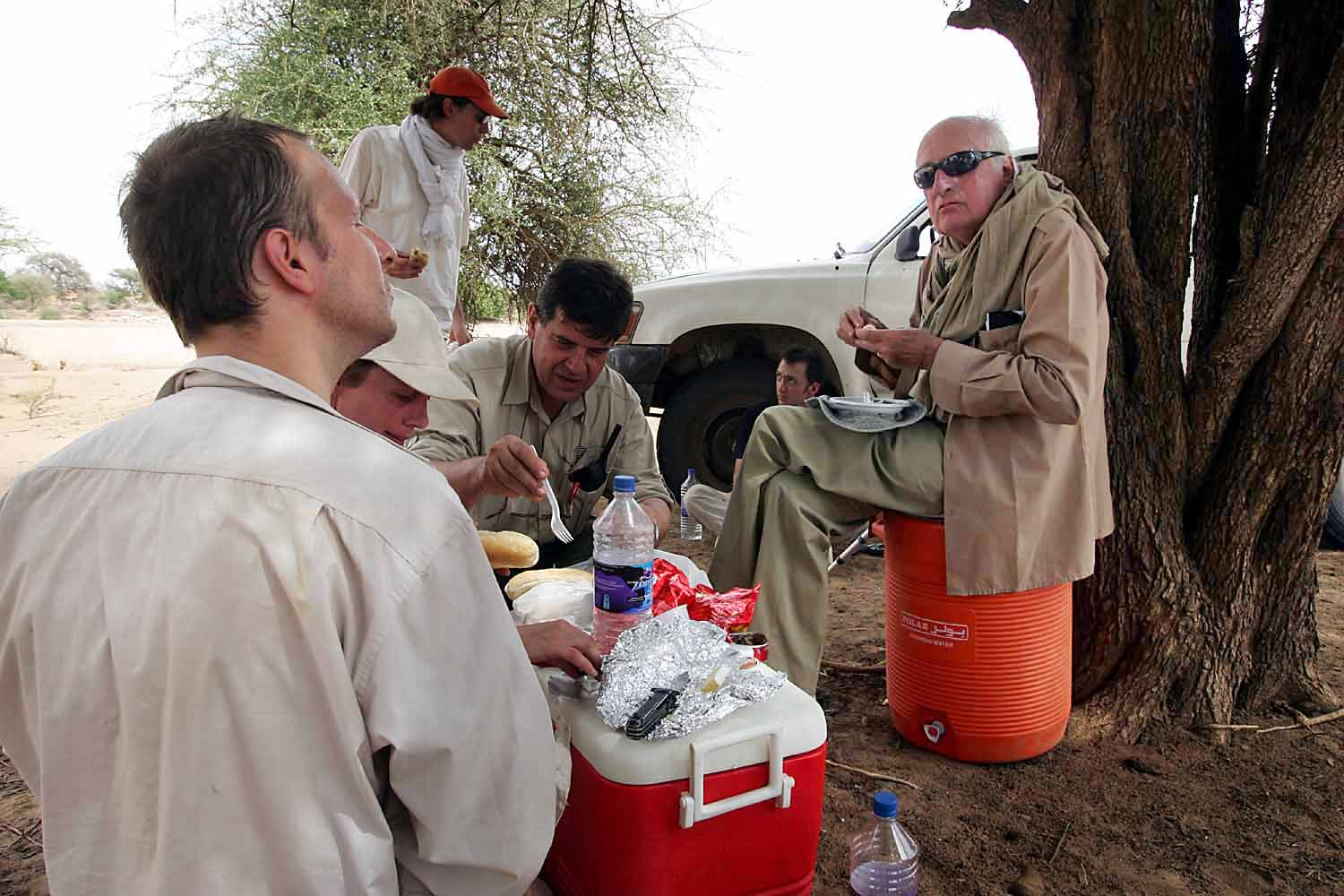
Deniau (right) in Darfur with Care, 2004

=== Politician and diplomat ===
In 1958, he became the director of Foreign Relations for the European Commission. He was the author of the foreword of the Treaty of Rome. In 1963, he was named French ambassador to Mauritania and in 1967 he was appointed as one of the French European Commissioners, as a member of the Rey Commission, in 1970 followed by his membership of the Malfatti Commission. He was responsible for the accession negotiations of Great Britain, the Republic of Ireland, Denmark and Norway, and for assistance to developing countries.

In 1973, he entered the government of Pierre Messmer as Secretary of State for Coopération, and was then named Secretary of State to the Ministry of Agriculture and Rural Development in the government formed by Jacques Chirac after the election of Valéry Giscard d'Estaing to the presidency of the French Republic in 1974. In 1976, J.F. Deniau became France's ambassador to Madrid, on the request of the new king Juan Carlos, with whom he had begun a friendship during regattas. Deniau would play an active advisory role to the king and the government during Spain's democratic transition following the death of General Franco.

In September 1977, Jean-François Deniau was named Secretary of State to the Ministry of Foreign Affairs in the government of Raymond Barre, then Minister of Foreign Commerce (1978), and finally Minister of Administrative Reform in Raymond Barre's last government (1981).

From 1978 to 1981 and from 1986 to 1997 he was a member of the French parliament.

=== As a writer ===
He was elected to the Académie Française on 9 April 1992.

He died in Paris in 2007, aged 78.

== Bibliography ==
- Le Bord des larmes (1955)
- Le Marché commun (1958)
- La mer est ronde (1975)
- L'Europe interdite (1977)
- Deux heures après minuit (1985)
- La Désirade (1988)
- Un héros très discret (1989)
- L'Empire nocturne (1990)
- Ce que je crois (1992)
- Le Secret du Roi des serpents (1993)
- Mémoires de sept vies. Tome 1 : Les temps aventureux (1994)
- L'Atlantique est mon désert (1996)
- Mémoires de sept vies. Tome 2 : Croire et oser (1997)
- Le Bureau des secrets perdus (1998)
- Tadjoura (1999)
- Histoires de courage (2000)
- La bande à Suzanne (2000)
- L'île Madame (2001)
- Dictionnaire amoureux de la mer (2002)
- La gloire à 20 ans (2003)
- La Double Passion écrire ou agir (2004)
- La Lune et le miroir (2004)
- Le Secret du roi des Serpents (2005)
- Le grand jeu (2005)
