= Luxembourg compromise =

1966 political compromise within the European Economic Community

The Luxembourg compromise (or Luxembourg accord) was an agreement reached in January 1966 to resolve the "Empty Chair Crisis" which had caused a stalemate within the European Economic Community (EEC).

== Charles de Gaulle ==
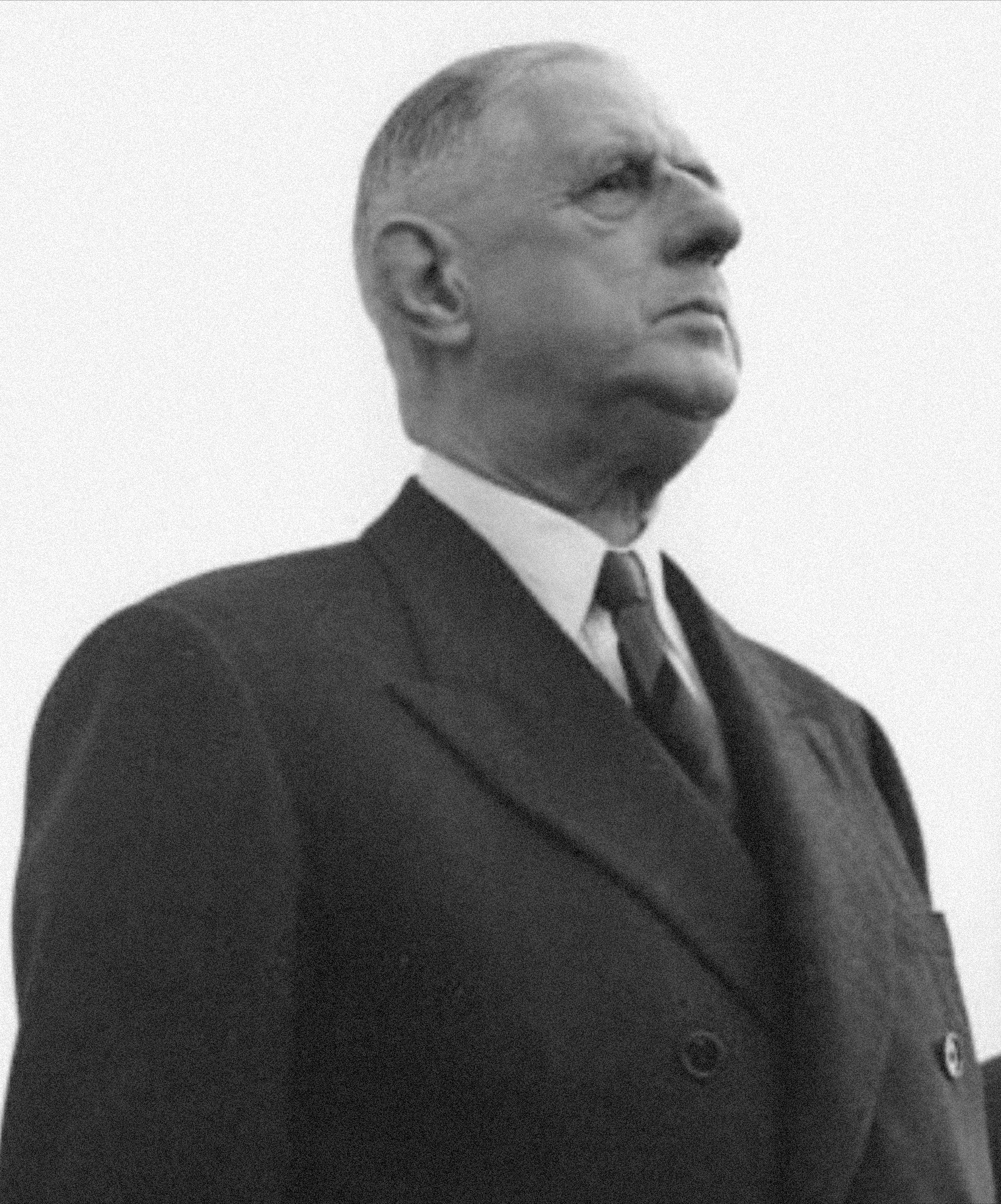
President Charles de Gaulle, pictured in 1961

Whereas the founding fathers of the EEC (Konrad Adenauer, Robert Schuman and Jean Monnet) were avowed European integrationists, Charles de Gaulle was a French nationalist. In 1960, De Gaulle believed that a council of the heads of government should be created with a secretariat in Paris. He desired a European institution that would give France greater power in Europe. He also sought to create a political union to further the economic union already in existence, the European Economic Community. This was his second attempt at creating more political coordination in Europe, the first being a Franco-Italian proposal that would have required that foreign ministers met outside the EEC structures regularly. The Dutch were quick to block that proposal, preferring to keep any political union talks within the Western European Union.

The West German Chancellor Konrad Adenauer met with De Gaulle in July 1960 where De Gaulle presented a nine-point plan entitled "A Note on the Subject of the Organisation of Europe". In this plan, De Gaulle proposed a diminished supranational influence and an end to the American-led integration. It soon became apparent to the other five members of the EEC that De Gaulle was planning on creating a political union that would cut out not only American influence but British influence as well. Moreover, it would reconfigure the existing EEC institutions. The plan would call for regular summits, a parliament consisting of representatives from each of the member states' parliaments, and a national referendum.

The other five were interested in a political union, but they expressed concern about the new configuration. Chancellor Adenauer reluctantly agreed to the plan, as long as provisions could be included which would keep NATO in Europe and preserve the existing EEC organs. Dutch Foreign Minister Joseph Luns was resistant to this new reorganisation, fearing that the exclusion of the United Kingdom and NATO would leave Europe vulnerable. Moreover, De Gaulle's plans would have meant a far more intergovernmental Europe, in which the majority of the power would rest with member states and not in supranational organisations. This would have meant a step backwards for European integration. Luns saw De Gaulle as an aspiring hegemon seeking to expand French influence throughout the continent. De Gaulle was clearly trying to increase French power: "Europe is the means for France to recover what it ceased to be after Waterloo: first in the world".

Furthermore, the Dutch were concerned that leaving the United Kingdom out of Europe was irresponsible, but De Gaulle was vehemently opposed to the United Kingdom's accession to the community. In his eyes, it would create a backdoor for NATO and the United States to involve themselves in Europe. Moreover, the UK would interfere with De Gaulle's plans for "La Grande Nation": France as a superpower standing between the United States and the USSR. In October 1960, De Gaulle sent his Prime Minister to West Germany and was successful in getting Adenauer to agree to a heads of state meeting to take place in February 1961. Adenauer was mistrustful of De Gaulle, rightfully believing that he was trying to create a "leading role for France in Europe". He combined with the Dutch opinion; it led to the meeting being a failure for De Gaulle. It was agreed, however, that a committee should be formed to discuss possible political union".

In autumn 1961, a committee was formed to address plans for a political union in Europe. The Fouchet Committee, named after Christian Fouchet, drafted a plan that would include defence among other political recourses. Any mention of NATO was conspicuously left out. While West Germany and Italy generally accepted the plan, provided that the NATO issue could be worked out, it was again the Dutch who opposed the plan. They also wanted to link any discussion on a political union with British accession to the EEC. France was opposed. Sensing that he had support of at least three member states, West Germany, Italy and France, De Gaulle shifted tactics and he reissued the Fouchet Plan in January 1962. This plan again omitted NATO and sent a clear message that De Gaulle wanted to separate Europe from NATO. This move irritated the other members, including Italy and West Germany and strengthened the Dutch position.

De Gaulle backtracked and in February 1962 went to West Germany to appeal to Adenauer. He reintroduced the omitted NATO passage to placate the Chancellor, but Adenauer did not want a Franco-German domination. De Gaulle was less timid: "Once (France and West Germany) are in agreement, their decision should be imposed". Adenauer again changed his position, but the Dutch and Belgians would not tolerate De Gaulle's plan. The issue was dropped at the April summit.

== Empty Chair Crisis ==
In July 1965, De Gaulle boycotted European institutions due to issues he had regarding new political proposals by the European Commission. This event, known as the "Empty Chair Crisis", affected the European Community. Several issues regarding European political integration led to the confrontation. De Gaulle believed that national governments should move towards integration and did not agree with the Commission's attempt to create a shift towards supranationalism, extending powers beyond national borders.

After the failure of the Fouchet Plan and De Gaulle's veto of the United Kingdom's application for EC membership, the Commission attempted to move towards integration by proposing an idea that would combine the Common Agricultural Policy (CAP), the European Parliament, and Commission. De Gaulle supported the creation of the CAP and favoured its enactment. However, he disagreed with the Parliament's new role, the Commission's strength, the shift towards supranationalism, and the budget proposals for financing the CAP. De Gaulle made it a condition that majority voting with a right to veto must exist if France was to participate in the European Community. When De Gaulle was not granted a more intergovernmental Commission or voting and veto rights, the French representative left the Council of Ministers.

== Views of the member states ==
=== Benelux reaction ===
At the outset of the empty chair crisis, the Benelux states sought to minimise the total damage that the crisis could potentially have on the EEC, and the Benelux Political Consultation Committee (COCOPO) immediately worked to establish a common stance on next steps, which proved difficult, causing a schism among the three states. Belgium and Luxembourg both saw the necessity for the Benelux to act as a mediator between France and the rest of the EEC and wanted to encourage the prompt return of the French delegation while maintaining the possibility for the creation of the common market in the future. The creation of the common market was of particular importance to Belgium, as it was vital to its own industry and moving forward without the French would hurt the potential of such a policy.

Another concern of the Belgian delegation was to ensure that the seat of the EEC remain in Brussels. The Belgian desire to remain relatively neutral within the feud was also affected by the large number of French speakers who generally viewed French demands sympathetically. They argued for a continuation of the discussion while keeping France notified of the developments but making only technical decisions and absolutely no explicit commitments. While the Belgians wished to continue operations within the Commission and the Council, the Luxembourgish stressed that any meetings of the Commission or Council must be strictly unofficial and that any action that could be viewed by France as confrontational must be avoided.

As a result, no decisions were made in the initial meetings following the start of the crisis. Luxembourg argued that the central issues of the crisis came from a lack of a decided common goal for the community, something that needed to be determined for any further treaties to be agreed upon and ratified. In contrast to the other Benelux states moving towards roles as peacekeepers and mediators, the Netherlands were opposed to the French decision to leave Brussels from the beginning. They quickly aligned themselves with the positions of West Germany and Italy, while recognising the benefits of continued communication with France as the community moved forward. Nevertheless, they were largely in favour of proceeding with official negotiations with only five states and, if possible, making decisions for France to come to terms with if they rejoined the community in the future.

These different stances within the Benelux complicated the cohesiveness of any decision adopted by COCOPO. Without the backing of the Netherlands, the proposal to postpone negotiations submitted by Belgium and Luxembourg was immediately rejected. The committee did not adopt any common decision until the proposal of the Spaak Plan, created by Belgian Foreign Minister Paul-Henri Spaak. The Spaak Plan suggested a meeting of the Council without the participation of the Commission, where a common stance on the critical issues surrounding the crisis would be decided and presented to France for evaluation, hopefully leading towards negotiation and the return of the French Delegation. That became the stance of COCOPO as a whole, to wait out the crisis, while showing some initiative to resolve it and bring France back to the discussion.

=== Italian and West German reaction ===
Both Italy and West Germany were extremely dissatisfied with the French domination in the early years of the EEC. By utilising their own country’s fragile political situation, they managed to turn the Treaty of Rome into a major French diplomatic victory, and no other country was able to gain as much as the French. This was combined with an enormously biased CAP that left Italy as the highest net contributor (while still being the poorest country) and left West Germany with "unacceptably high" 2.8 billion DM annual contribution.

The most important factor in the willingness of the Italian and West German governments to stand up to De Gaulle and the French was the decreased fear that France would actually leave the EEC. In the face of how much the French were able to gain from the EEC, it became increasingly difficult for French diplomats to rationalise that France was in any way interested in leaving the EEC. According to Ludwig Erhard, the West German negotiator, this was all a bluff and the French would never withdraw from the EEC since they were the main beneficiaries.

After the Luxembourg compromise, the West German and Italian governments found a new balance in the majority voting procedure, something that allowed them both to override the French government when they felt the French were being too aggressive. This would serve Italy exceptionally well, namely for the new majority vote on the regulations of fats and oils, and the fixing of common price for beef. The West German gains from the compromise were more political, mainly in weakening the intergovernmental forces that allowed France to be so dominant.

== The compromise ==
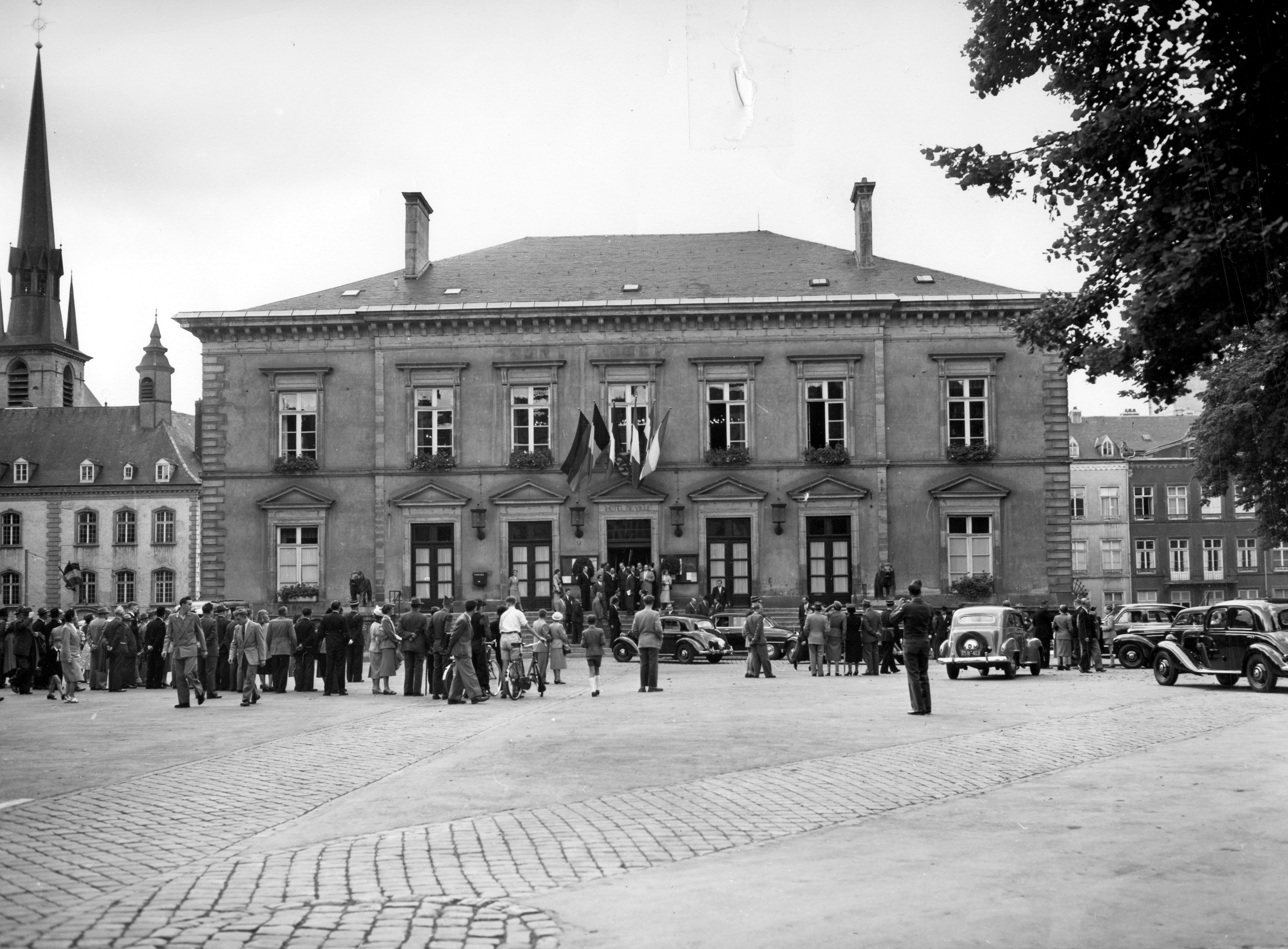
Luxembourg City Hall (pictured in 1952), where the compromise was reached

=== Veto power ===
Within the Luxembourg compromise, a de facto veto power was given to every state on topics that were deemed to be 'very important national interest(s)'. It was agreed upon that should a topic of concern arise, Members of the Council would seek to create a solution that all members could unanimously agree upon, regardless of whether or not the treaty required only a majority. However, the question of what should be done if no agreement was reached was interpreted differently by various members of the Community. While the flaws of such a system seemed evident, the compromise assumed that if an agreement was not reached, it would "not prevent the Community's work being resumed in accordance with the normal procedure". Contrary to this assumption, the Luxembourg compromise did prevent the Community's decision-making for almost 20 years, until a veto by Britain was over-ridden in 1982 when, ironically, its interests were challenged by the French.

=== Common Agricultural Policy (CAP) ===
The Common Agricultural Policy was born of the Treaty of Rome in 1957. The CAP was partially reformed in 1966 as a result of the empty chair crisis and the Luxembourg compromise. Policies within the CAP are voted on using qualified majority voting, a stipulations of the Luxembourg compromise. The CAP set up an international agricultural organisation that set prices for market goods like fruits, vegetables, sugar and cereals. Some of the CAP's other goals are to: increase agricultural productivity, ensure a standard of living for farmers, stabilise markets, to readily provide available supplies at reasonable prices to consumers.

=== A weaker Commission ===
The compromise had a restraining effect on the Commission. In stressing the vitality of a balance of powers between member state preferences and supranational ideals within the Community, it tethered the Commission to the Council. As a result, the process of integration slowed, and the minimal amount of legislation proposed by the Council limited the Commission's power to implement policy. Overall, the administrative and initiative authorities that the Commission previously enjoyed on its own now needed the Council's approval.

In a joint meeting of the European Parliament, the Council and the Executives on 28 and 29 January 1966, it was agreed that the Commission must seek the Council’s approval on several policy measures. These include:

1. The Commission must contact the permanent representatives of the member states before adopting any policy proposals.
2. The Commission must refrain from making proposals known to the public before the Council and the Member States receive formal notice and have possession of the texts.
3. The Commission must meet with the President of the Council to review the credentials of Heads of Missions of non-member states accredited to the Community.
4. The Commission must inform the Council and vice versa of any questions posed by non-member states regarding either institution.
5. The Commission must consult with the Council before pursuing any links with international organisations.
6. The Commission must co-operate with the Council in establishing an information policy.
7. The Commission must work with the Council to decide on financial commitments and expenditures made by the Community.

The compromise's allowance for a veto also weakened the Commission’s ability to push for legislation. In knowing that any member state could terminate the effort with a no vote, the Commission was discouraged from proposing controversial and deeper integration policies.

=== Qualified majority voting ===
A compromise between all the member states was reached on the issue of qualified majority voting (QMV) in the Luxembourg compromise. The Commission planned to extend the Community's power by expanding the number of issues subject to QMV. Charles de Gaulle was against the expansion of the Community's powers. The agreement reached was that, whenever a decision was subject to QMV, the Council would postpone the decision if a Member State claimed their national interests were being threatened. This compromise meant that no decision could be taken until a unanimously accepted agreement was reached. The QMV gave the smaller states greater voting weight since they were given a higher proportion relative to their population.

== Ramifications for integration ==
The Luxembourg compromise is viewed as a turning of the tide in the history of European integration. It safeguarded the intergovernmental nature of the EC, therefore preserving state sovereignty. It also prevented the EC from further consolidating power and therefore becoming more supranational, or taking power out of the hands of the states. This meant the EC was moving in the opposite direction of the original assumption that it "would eventually transform itself into a fully-fledged state". Instead, a norm developed in the Council that all decisions should be taken unanimously. Although the Luxembourg compromise was only formally invoked around ten times between 1966 and 1981, its "shadow" hung over the Council and made decision-making much more difficult. Today, although majority voting has come to be used more frequently and the Luxembourg compromise is all but defunct, the member states still prefer to take decisions by unanimity, because a decision reached by consensus means national authorities are more likely to implement EU directives into national law with enthusiasm, vigor, and in a timely manner.

== Literature ==
- Camps, M. (1964). The six and politícal union. The World Today, 20(1), 473–80.
- Cini, Michelle and Nieves Perez-Solorzano Borragan (eds.). European Politics. Oxford: Oxford University Press, 2010.
- Corbett, Richard; 'The European Parliament's Role in Closer European Integration', London, Macmillan (1998)ISBN 0-333-72252-3 and New York, St Martin's Press (1998) ISBN 0-312-21103-1. Reprinted in paperback by Palgrave, London (2001) ISBN 0-333-94938-2
- De Gaulle's First Veto: France, the Rueff Plan and the Free Trade Area Frances. M. B. Lynch, Contemporary European History, Vol. 9, No. 1 (Mar. 2000), pp. 111–135.
- Garrett, Geoffrey. 1995. "From the Luxembourg Compromise to Codecision: Decision Making in the European Union. " Electoral Studies 14 (3):289–308.
- Golub, Johnathan. 1999. "In the Shadow of the Vote? Decision Making in the European Community." International Organization 53:733–764.
- Ludlow, N. Piers. 2005. "The Making of CAP: Towards a Historical Analysis of the EU’s First Major Policy." Contemporary European History 14:347–371.
- Ludlow, N. Piers, Challenging French Leadership in Europe: Germany, Italy, the Netherlands and the Outbreak of the Empty Chair Crisis of 1965–1966. In: Contemporary European History. Vol 8(2).
- Luxembourg compromise bulletin
- Moravcsik, Andrew. 2000. "De Gaulle Between Grain and Grandeur: The Political Economy of French EC Policy, 1958–1970 (Part 2)." Journal of Cold War Studies 2:4–68.
- Nicholl, W. 1984. "The Luxembourg Compromise." Journal of Common Market Studies 23: 35–44.
- Palayret, Jean Marie, Wallace, Helen, and Winand, Pascualine. Visions, Votes, and Vetoes: The Empty Chair Crisis and the Luxembourg Compromise Forty Years Later." Brussels, Belgium: P.I.E-Peter Lang, 2006.
- Spaak, P. (1965). A new effort to build Europe. Foreign Affairs, 43(2), 199–208.
- Teasdale, Anthony. 1993. "The Life and Death of the Luxembourg Compromise." Journal of Common Market Studies, 31(4), 567–579.
- Vanke, J. (2001). An impossible union: Dutch objections to the Fouchet plan, 1959–62 . Cold War History, 2(1), 95–113. DOI:10.1080/713999943
