= Nadia Essayan =

French politician (born 1957)

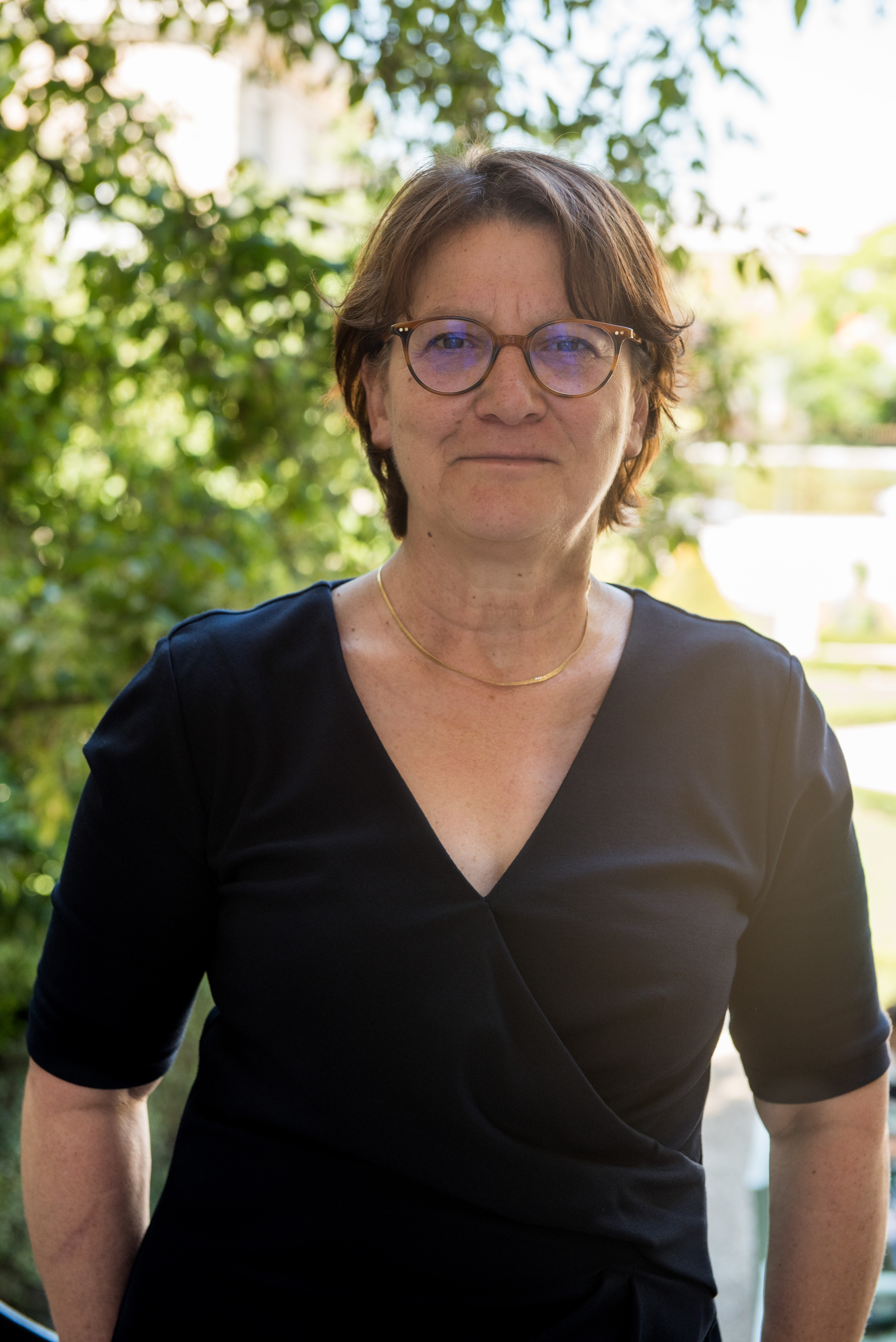
- Nadia Essayan in 2017

Member of the National Assembly for Cher's 2nd constituency
- In office 21 June 2017 – June 2022
- Preceded by: Nicolas Sansu

Personal details
- Born: 6 June 1957 (age 68) Dimbokro, Ivory Coast
- Party: MoDem

Nadia Essayan (born 6 June 1957) is a French politician representing the Democratic Movement. She was elected to the French National Assembly on 18 June 2017, representing Cher's 2nd constituency.

She lost her seat in the first round of the 2022 French legislative election.

== See also ==
- 2017 French legislative election
