= Robert Lemaignen =

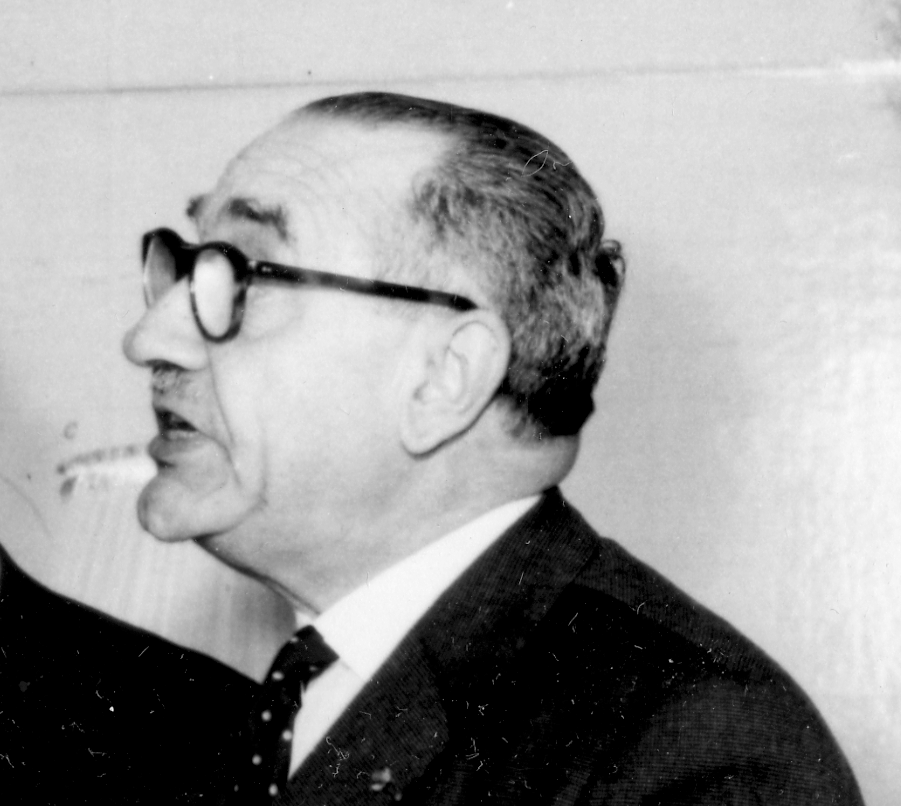
- Lemaignen in 1961

European Commissioner for Overseas Development
- In office 7 January 1958 – 9 January 1962
- President: Walter Hallstein
- Preceded by: Position established
- Succeeded by: Henri Rochereau

Personal details
- Born: 15 March 1893; Blois, France
- Died: 3 April 1980 (aged 87); Paris, France

Robert Lemaignen (15 March 1893 – 3 April 1980) was a French European Commissioner.

He was appointed as one of the first French European Commissioners on the first Hallstein Commission from 1958 to 1962. He did not remain a member of the second Hallstein commission and was succeeded as commissioner by Henri Rochereau. Lemaignen was responsible for Overseas development.

Lemaignen had previously been the vice-president of the French Employers Federation (with extensive African experience).

Political offices
New office	French European Commissioner; 1958–1962; Served alongside: Robert Marjolin	Succeeded by Robert Marjolin
New office	French European Commissioner; 1958–1962; Served alongside: Robert Marjolin	Succeeded by Henri Rochereau
New office	European Commissioner for Overseas Development; 1958–1962	Succeeded by Henri Rochereau
