= Jean-Claude Sandrier =

French politician

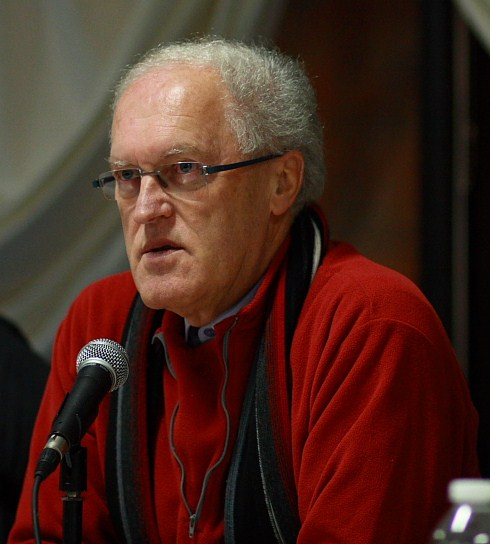
- Jean-Claude Sandrier in 2010

Member of the National Assembly for Cher's 2nd constituency
- In office 12 June 1997 – 19 June 2012
- Preceded by: Franck Thomas-Richard
- Succeeded by: Nicolas Sansu

Mayor of Bourges
- In office 1 June 1993 – 18 June 1995
- Preceded by: Jacques Raimbault
- Succeeded by: Serge Lepeltier

Personal details
- Born: 7 August 1945 (age 80) Gannat, Allier, France
- Party: French Communist Party
- Profession: Technician

Jean-Claude Sandrier (born 7 August 1945 in Gannat, Allier) is a French politician and former Mayor of Bourges. He is a member of the French Communist Party.

Joining the Communist in the Bourges city council in 1977, Sandrier became mayor of the city in 1989, but was not re-elected in 1995. He was elected member of Parliament for the second constituency of the Cher in the 1997 election, and was re-elected in 2002 and 2007. He was succeeded in the constituency by Nicolas Sansu, also of the communists. He was a member and president of the GDR parliamentary group in the 13th Legislature.

== Biography ==
Jean-Claude Sandrier holds an advanced technician's certificate in chemistry. He began his career as a technician at the Établissements militaires de Bourges, where he worked on powders and explosives.

He joined the French Communist Party in 1969. In 1977, when the left came to power in Bourges, he became secretary of the party's Cher federation.

He joined the city council during Jacques Rimbault's second term in 1983, taking charge of sports. As deputy mayor, he became first deputy in 1989, then mayor of Bourges after the death of Jacques Rimbault. He held this position until 1995, losing the municipal elections to Serge Lepeltier, who headed an RPR-UDF list.

He was elected general councilor for Cher in 1988, then Regional council (France) in 1998.

In 1999, Jean-Claude Sandrier submitted a report on Giat to Michel Sapin, the Socialist Party president of the Centre-Val de Loire. For several years, the Bourges employment area had been suffering from the crisis in the arms industry. In the region, the group's social plan led to the closure of the Salbris site in 2000 and further job cuts in Bourges.

He was elected deputy on June 1, 1997, for the 11th legislature (1997-2002), then for the 12th (2002-2007) in the second district of Cher. Re-elected on June 17, 2007, he is a member of the Democratic and Republican Left group, of which he was president. A municipal councilor for the city of Vierzon since March 2008, he was elected president of the Vierzon, Pays des Cinq Rivières community of municipalities.

In 2004, he was one of five Communist deputies to vote in favor of the French law on secularity and conspicuous religious symbols in schools, with fourteen voting against it.

In 2010, he disapproved of Nicolas Sarkozy desire to abolish the ISF.

Along with two other Communist MPs, Marie-George Buffet and Roland Muzeau, in 2011 he called on Communists to vote for Jean-Luc Mélenchon in the selection of the Front de gauche candidate for 2012.
