= Yves Sandrier =

Swiss poet and singer

Yves Sandrier (1938–1958) was a Swiss poet and singer. Born Yves Altmann, in Geneva, he gains international fame after participating in a radio show on Europe I, in France, in February 1957. Altmann took the name Sandrier after playing the role of the hero in Montherlant's play, La ville dont le prince est un enfant.

The French-speaking Radio Suisse Romande created a Yves Sandrier Prize in 2002 to support new talents.
