= Robert Marjolin =

French economist and politician (1911–1986)

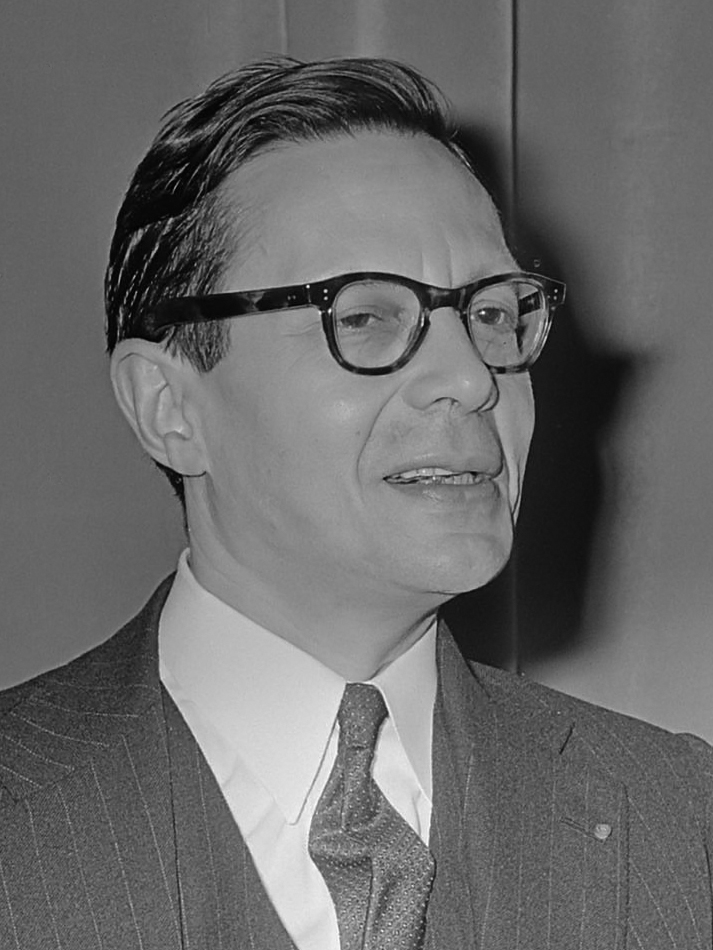
- Marjolin in 1964

European Commissioner for Economic and Financial Affairs
- In office 7 January 1958 – 30 June 1967
- President: Walter Hallstein
- Preceded by: Position established
- Succeeded by: Raymond Barre

1st Secretary-General of the OEEC
- In office 1948–1955
- Preceded by: Position established
- Succeeded by: René Sergent

Personal details
- Born: 27 July 1911 Paris, France
- Died: 15 April 1986 (aged 74) Paris, France
- Party: French Section of the Workers' International
- Education: Practical School of Advanced Studies; University of Paris; Yale University

Robert Marjolin (27 July 1911 – 15 April 1986) was a French economist and politician involved in the formation of the European Economic Community.

== Early life and education ==
Robert Majolin was born in Paris, the son of an upholsterer. He left school at the age of 14 to begin work but took evening and correspondence courses at the Sorbonne. A 1931 scholarship from the Rockefeller Foundation enabled him to study sociology and economics at Yale University, which he completed in 1934. He also received a postgraduate doctorate in jurisprudence in 1936. From 1938 he worked as a chief assistant to Charles Rist at the Institute of Economics in Paris. His research at this time, as well as his later political work, was strongly affected by the New Deal programs of American President Franklin D. Roosevelt. Marjolin was particularly concerned with production and price history as well as monetary policy.

== World War II and De Gaulle administrations ==
After the June 1940 French surrender to Germany during the Second World War, Marjolin became an economic advisor to the De Gaulle Government-in-exile in Great Britain. Before the final phase of the war, he had already sketched plans for the reconstruction of France and the rest of Europe. In 1943 he represented the Government-in-exile in Washington as director of a purchasing mission. He rejected attempts by the American economy to win itself a prominent position in this mission. While in America he met the artist Dorothy Smith, who came from a Presbyterian family and would become his wife.

After the war, Marjolin became the first director of the foreign trade department in the French Ministry of Economic Affairs and then junior minister for the reconstruction of France. In this role, he initiated the economic development of France for the following decades. In contrast with Ludwig Erhard of Germany, Marjolin implemented a strong state control of the economy. This contrast defined the relationship between the French and German economic policies for the remainder of the 20th century.

== The Marshall Plan and the OEEC ==
Due to his ministerial responsibilities, Marjolin was particularly involved with the Marshall Plan for assistance to Europe. In August 1947 he published a memorandum which helped persuade the United States Congress to support the plan. In 1948 Marjolin was appointed the first Secretary-General of the Organisation for European Economic Co-operation (OEEC) which was established to implement the Marshall Plan. Particularly in the last years of his involvement, he tried to divert the organization from its course as a purely technical authority for the administration of European trade relations. He wanted it to become politically active, in order to achieve both an economic and also an increasing political integration of European countries.

Towards the end of 1954 Marjolin surprisingly resigned from his OEEC position stating that he wished to become "an international civil servant". For a short time, he was a member of the staff of the socialist minister of foreign affairs Christian Pineau and an economics professor at the University of Nancy.

== Inaugural European Commission member ==
In 1955 he led the French delegation in negotiations on the formation of the European Economic Community (EEC). He attached particular importance to setting a common economic policy, and a financial and monetary policy and as a result got the support of the German delegation leader Alfred Mueller Armack as well as its deputy Hans von der Groeben.

In 1958 he was appointed one of the two French European Commissioners on the first European Commission, the Hallstein Commission with responsibility for the economics and finance portfolios. In January 1962 he was re-appointed to the second Hallstein Commission. Marjolin unsuccessfully stood as a candidate for the French socialists in the French parliamentary election, November 1962. A victory would have meant his leaving the commission but instead, he served his full term which expired in January 1967.

Robert Marjolin died in 1986, aged 74, leaving behind a son and a daughter.

Political offices
New office	French European Commissioner; 1958–1967; Served alongside: Robert Lemaignen, Henri Rochereau	Succeeded by Henri Rochereau
New office	French European Commissioner; 1958–1967; Served alongside: Robert Lemaignen, Henri Rochereau	Succeeded by Raymond Barre
New office	European Commissioner for Economic and Financial Affairs; 1958–1967	Succeeded by Raymond Barre
