= Nicolas Sansu =

French politician

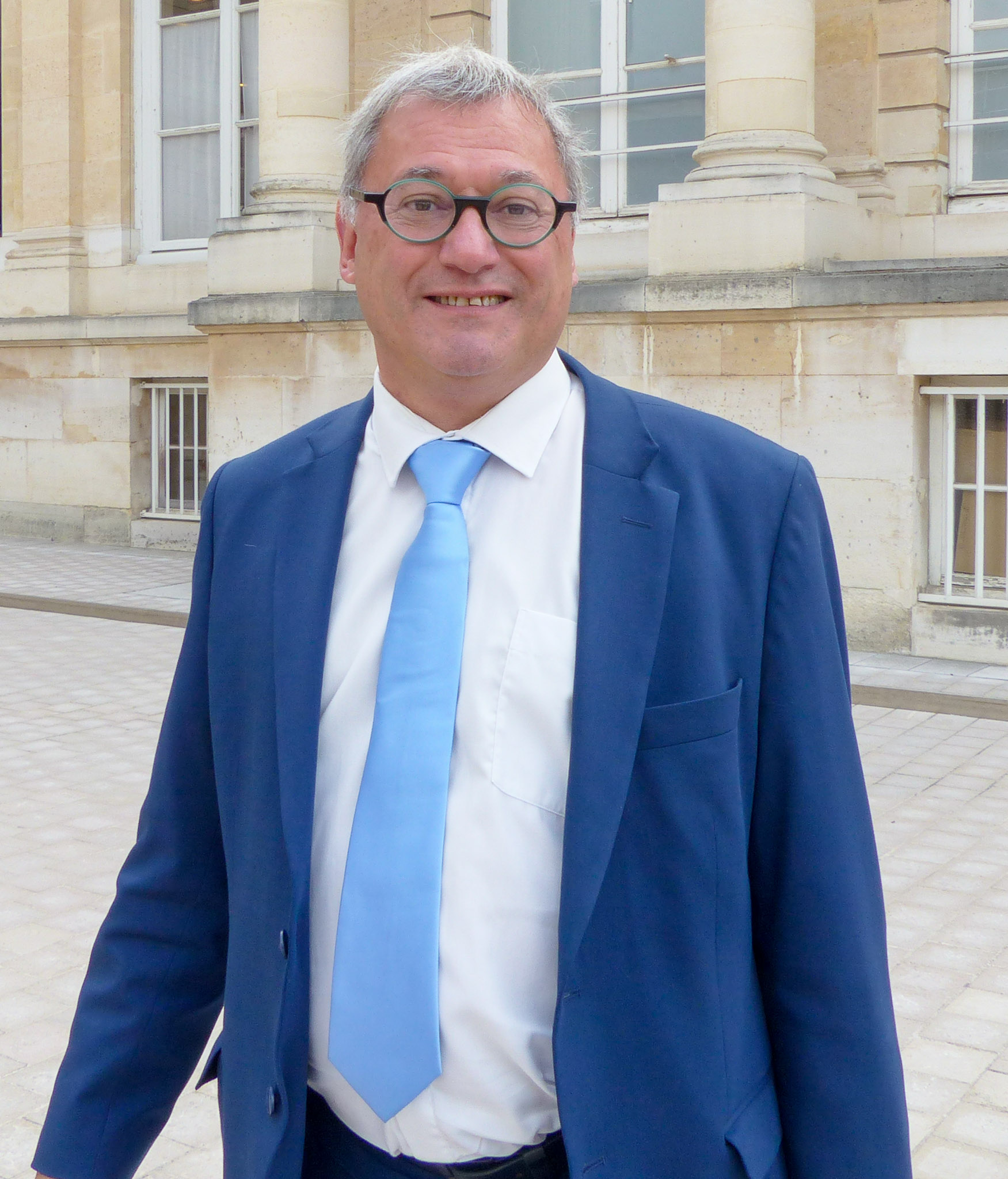

Member of the National Assembly for Cher's 2nd constituency
- Incumbent
- Assumed office 22 June 2022
- Preceded by: Nadia Essayan
- In office 20 June 2012 – 20 June 2017
- Preceded by: Jean-Claude Sandrier
- Succeeded by: Nadia Essayan

Mayor of Vierzon
- In office 16 March 2008 – 3 July 2022
- Preceded by: Jean Rousseau
- Succeeded by: Corinne Ollivier

General Councillor of Cher
- In office 28 March 2004 – 25 June 2012
- Preceded by: François Dumon
- Succeeded by: Karine Chêne

Personal details
- Born: 17 June 1968 (age 56); Vierzon, France
- Political party: French Communist Party

Nicolas Sansu (born 17 June 1968) is a French politician and engineer.

He is member of the French Communist Party and served as mayor of Vierzon since 2008. He was re-elected of the mayor of Vierzon in 2014. He is vice-president of the General Council in charge of infrastructures. He was elected MP for Cher's 2nd constituency in the 2012 French legislative election. He was according to Capital magazine and the Regards citizens collective, the 39th best MP in the National Assembly for his attendance and his parliamentary work. He lost his seat in the 2017 French legislative election.

He was the NUPES candidate in Cher's 2nd constituency in the 2022 French legislative election. He was re-elected to the seat, winning it back off MoDem's Nadia Essayan, who was eliminated in the first round.

== Biography ==
Sansu was born in Vierzon, France on 1968. He announced in October 2019 to be a candidate for the 3rd time in the municipal election in Vierzon. He also member of the UNEF-SE national office during his studies, he holds a diploma of advanced studies in economic sciences. He is elected mayor by the new municipal council.

Political offices
Preceded by Jean Rousseau	Mayor of Vierzon; 16 March 2008	Succeeded by Incumbent
Preceded by Jean-Claude Sandrier	Deputy of the 2nd constituency of Cher; 20 June 2012-20 June 2017	Succeeded by Nadia Essayan
Preceded by François Dumon	General Councilor of Cher; 28 March 2004-25 June 2012	Succeeded by Karine Chêne
