= François Cormier-Bouligeon =

French politician (born 1972)

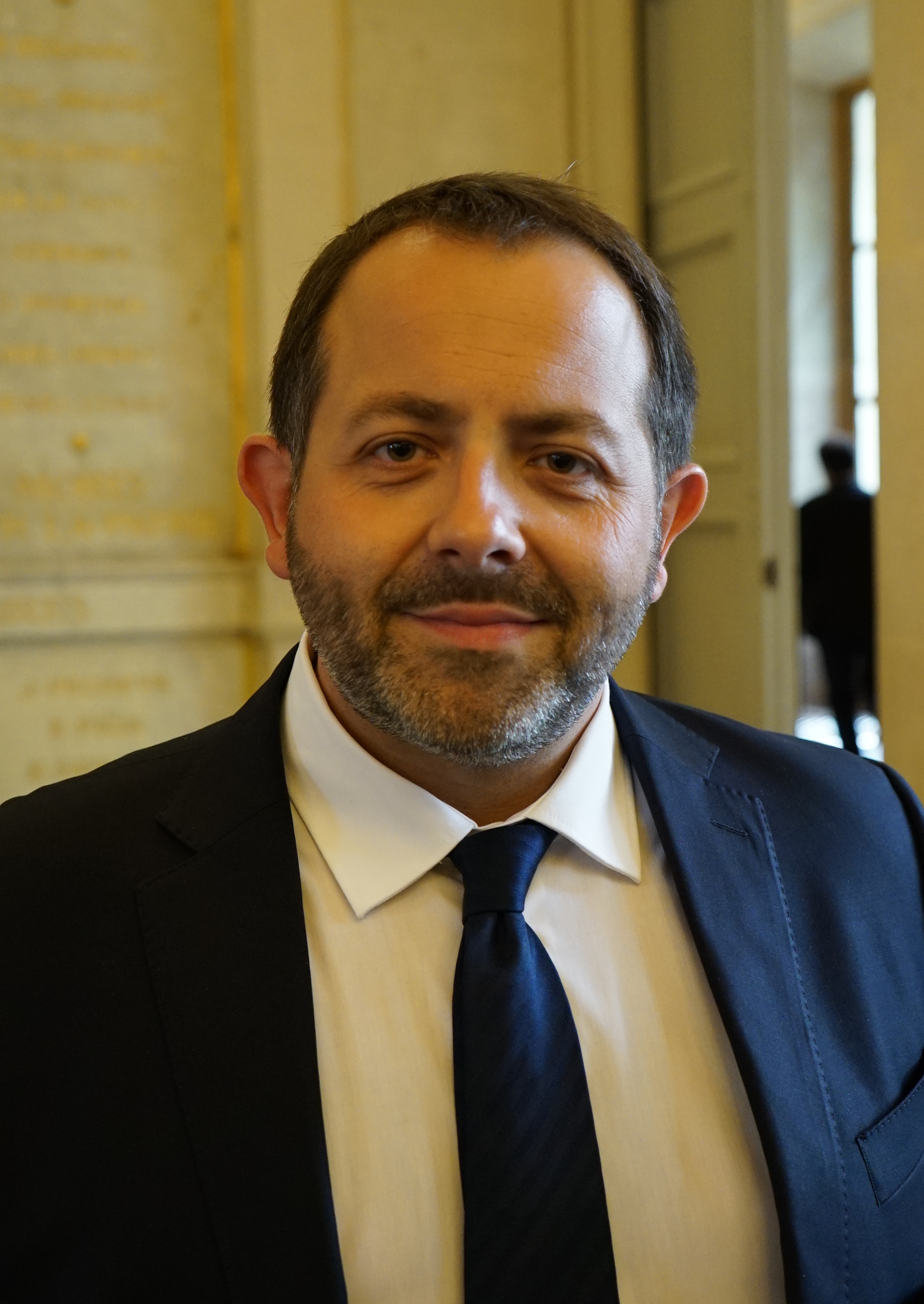

Member of the National Assembly for Cher's 1st constituency
- Incumbent
- Assumed office 18 June 2017
- Preceded by: Yves Fromion

Personal details
- Born: 19 November 1972 (age 53) Bourges, France
- Party: Renaissance

François Cormier-Bouligeon (born 19 November 1972) is a French politician of Renaissance (RE) who has been serving as a member of the French National Assembly since the 2017 elections, representing Cher's 1st constituency.

== Political career ==
Cormier-Bouligeon serves as member of the Committee on Cultural Affairs and Education. In addition to his committee assignments, he is a member of the French-Moroccan Parliamentary Friendship Group.

== Political positions ==
In July 2019, Cormier-Bouligeon voted in favor of the French ratification of the European Union’s Comprehensive Economic and Trade Agreement (CETA) with Canada.

In 2022, Cormier-Bouligeon was one of eight parliamentarians who asked President of the National Assembly Yaël Braun-Pivet to set up an investigation committee to look into alleged Russian financing of political parties.

== See also ==
- 2017 French legislative election
