= Hallstein Commission =

European Commission

The Hallstein Commission was the European Commission of the European Economic Community (EEC) between 7 January 1958 to 30 June 1967. Its president was Walter Hallstein and held two separate mandates.

In 1965, President of France Charles de Gaulle rejected Hallstein's proposed Common Agricultural Policy, resulting in the "empty chair crisis". In a boycott, France recalled its representative in Brussels and refused to take its seat in the Council of Ministers. The crisis was resolved by in 1966 by the Luxembourg compromise, which gave members a veto on matters deemed to be "very important national interest(s)".

== Work ==
It was the first commission of the European Economic Community and held its first formal meeting on 16 January 1958 at the Château of Val-Duchesse. It was succeeded by the Rey Commission. It served two terms and had 9 members (two each from France, Italy and Germany, one each from Luxembourg, Belgium and the Netherlands). It began work on the European single market and the Common Agricultural Policy. The commission enjoyed a number of successes, such as the cereal prices accord which it managed to achieve in the wake of de Gaulle's veto of Britain's membership. De Gaulle was a major opponent to the commission, and proposals such as the cereal prices accord were designed to bind France closer to the EEC to make it harder to break it up. Its work gained it esteem and prestige not only from the member states, but from outside the community when the commission made its debut at the Kennedy Round.

== Agricultural proposals ==
In 1965 president Hallstein put forward the commission's proposals for financing the Common Agricultural Policy (CAP). The proposals would have allowed the community to develop its own financial resources, independently of the states, and given more budgetary powers to parliament. Furthermore, though, it applied the majority voting into the council, which the government of France stated it could not agree to. Hallstein knew of the risky nature of the proposals and was unusually active in drafting them (they would normally have been drafted by the agriculture commissioner). The tone of internal deliberations at the time also show the institution was aware of what they would cause and some commissioners (notably both the French commissioners) were opposing the plans. However, they were also seen as vital for the commission's long-term goals.

The legislation would increase not only the commission's powers, but also the parliament's in an attempt to build a supranational structure and be rid of the power of veto. Because of this president Hallstein won support from the parliament who had long been campaigning for more powers. Indeed, Hallstein played to the parliament by presenting his policy to the Parliament on 24 March, a week before he presented them to the council. By this he associated himself with the Parliament's cause and demonstrated how he thought the community ought to be run, in the hopes of generating a wave of pro-Europeanism big enough to get past the objections of member states. However, in this it proved that, despite its past successes, Hallstein was overconfident in his risky proposals. When Hallstein put forward his proposals, the council was already troubled. Then-French President, Charles de Gaulle, was sceptical of the rising supranational power of the commission and accused Hallstein of acting as if he were a head of state. France was particularly concerned about protecting the CAP as it was only accepted by the other states after difficult negotiations and under a majority system it may be challenged by the other members.

== Empty chair crisis ==
The commission was blamed for the empty chair crisis

This, as well as similar differences between France and the commission, were exacerbated when France took on the presidency, thereby losing the normal system of mediation. Furthermore, the Commission became marginalised as the debate became one between France and the other members, making the council the centre of debate. Thus any chance of using the expertise of the commission to come up with proposals was lost. Finally on 30 June 1965 Paris recalled its representative in Brussels stating it would not take its seat in the council until it had its way. This "empty chair crisis" (French: Crise de la chaise vide) was the first time that the operation of the EEC had failed because of a member state and it exposed failures in the council's workings.

Paris continued its policy for six months until the impact upon its economy forced it back into negotiations. Meetings were held in Luxembourg during January 1966, where an agreement was reached. Under the "Luxembourg compromise" a member could veto a decision that it believed would affect its national interests – but it did not detail what kind of national interests or how to resolve a dispute. However, since then it had been used so often it became a veto making unanimity in the council the norm and was removed under the Single European Act. After the crisis, the commission became a scapegoat for the council, with Hallstein being the only person to lose his job over what happened when the council refused to renew his term, despite being the most 'dynamic' leader until Jacques Delors.

== First college ==
The first college served from 1 January 1958 to 9 January 1962.

Political leanings: [ 3 ] left leaning – [ 1 ] centrist – [ 5 ] right leaning – [ 0 ] unknown

Portfolio(s)	Commissioner	State	Party
President	Walter Hallstein	West Germany	CDU
Vice-President; Agriculture	Sicco Mansholt	Netherlands	PvdA
Vice-President; Economics and Finance	Robert Marjolin	France	independent later: SFIO
Vice-President; Internal Market	Piero Malvestiti; Served until 15-09-1959	Italy	DC
Internal Market	Giuseppe Caron; Served from 24-11-1959	Italy	DC
Overseas Development	Robert Lemaignen	France	independent
External Relations	Jean Rey	Belgium	PRL
Competition	Hans von der Groeben	West Germany	independent
Social Affairs	Giuseppe Petrilli; Served until 08-02-1961	Italy	independent
Social Affairs	Lionello Levi Sandri; Served from 08-02-1961	Italy	PSI
Transport	Michel Rasquin; Served until 27-04-1958	Luxembourg	LSAP
Transport	Lambert Schaus; Served from 18-06-1958	Luxembourg	CSV

== Second college ==
The second college served from 9 January 1962 to 30 June 1967.

Political leanings: [ 3 ] left leaning – [ 1 ] centrist – [ 5 ] right leaning – [ 0 ] unknown

Portfolio(s)	Commissioner	State	Party
President	Walter Hallstein	West Germany	CDU
Vice-President; Agriculture	Sicco Mansholt	Netherlands	PvdA
Vice-President; Economics and Finance	Robert Marjolin	France	independent later: SFIO
Vice-President; Internal Market	Giuseppe Caron; Served until 15-05-1963	Italy	DC
Internal Market	Guido Colonna di Paliano; Served from 30-07-1964	Italy	independent
Overseas Development	Henri Rochereau	France	independent
External Relations	Jean Rey	Belgium	PRL
Competition	Hans von der Groeben	West Germany	independent
Social Affairs; Vice-President from 1965-07-30	Lionello Levi Sandri	Italy	PSI
Transport	Lambert Schaus	Luxembourg	CSV

== See also ==
- History of the European Communities (1958-1972)

== Bibliography ==
- Dumoulin, Michel (2007). The European Commission, 1958-72 : history and memories. Luxembourg: Office for Official Publications of the European Communities. ISBN 978-92-79-05494-5.
- Groeben, Hans von der (1998). "Walter Hallstein as President of the Commission". In Loth, Wilfried; Wallace, William; Wessels, Wolfgang (eds.). Walter Hallstein: The Forgotten European?. Forewords by Jacques Delors, Sir Edward Heath, and Helmut Kohl; translated from the German by Bryan Ruppert. New York: St. Martin's Press. pp. 95–108. ISBN 978-0-312-21293-3.
- Hallstein, Walter (16 January 1958). Walter Hallstein's inaugural address to the constituent meeting of the Commission of the European Economic Community on 16 January 1958 (PDF) (Speech). Translated into English by the Centre Virtuel de la Connaissance sur l'Europe (CVCE). Brussels.
