= Yves Fromion =

French politician

Yves Fromion (born 15 September 1941) was a member of the National Assembly of France. He represented Cher department's 1st constituency from 1997 to 2017 as a member of the Union for a Popular Movement.

== Biography ==
A graduate of the École spéciale militaire de Saint-Cyr, Yves Fromion was elected deputy on June 1, 1997, for the 11th legislature (1997-2002), in the first constituency of Cher, against Roland Hodel. He was re-elected in 2002 and 2007. He is a member of the RPR and then UMP groups.

Yves Fromion is also the creator of the “Franco-Scottish festivals” in Aubigny-sur-Nère.

In 2006, he was tasked with a government mission on French arms exports and authored two parliamentary reports on the future of KNDS France and on research for the benefit of national defense.

Yves Fromion was appointed chairman of the fact-finding mission on the Karachi bombing, and in 2010 denounced numerous “fictions” in the parliamentary report, which stated that there could be a link between the cessation of commission payments to Pakistan and the Karachi bombing.

He supports Nicolas Sarkozy in the 2016 Republican presidential primary.

In April 2016, the deputy traveled to Syria with six other French parliamentarians. The Ministry of Foreign Affairs recommended canceling the visit. Then, on May 25, 2016, he proposed a resolution for the United Nations to recognize the genocide perpetrated by ISIS in Syria against “Christian, Yazidi, and other religious minorities in Syria and Iraq and to give jurisdiction to the International Criminal Court to prosecute the criminals,” calling on the government to refer the matter to the UN . The resolution was adopted despite the abstention of some members of parliament who argued that the resolution was selective, regretting that it did not seek to condemn all acts of violence against the civilian population, regardless of who committed them (Islamic State, Russia or the Syrian dictatorial regime) and regardless of ethnic or religious considerations.
