= Edgard Pisani =

French politician (1918–2016)

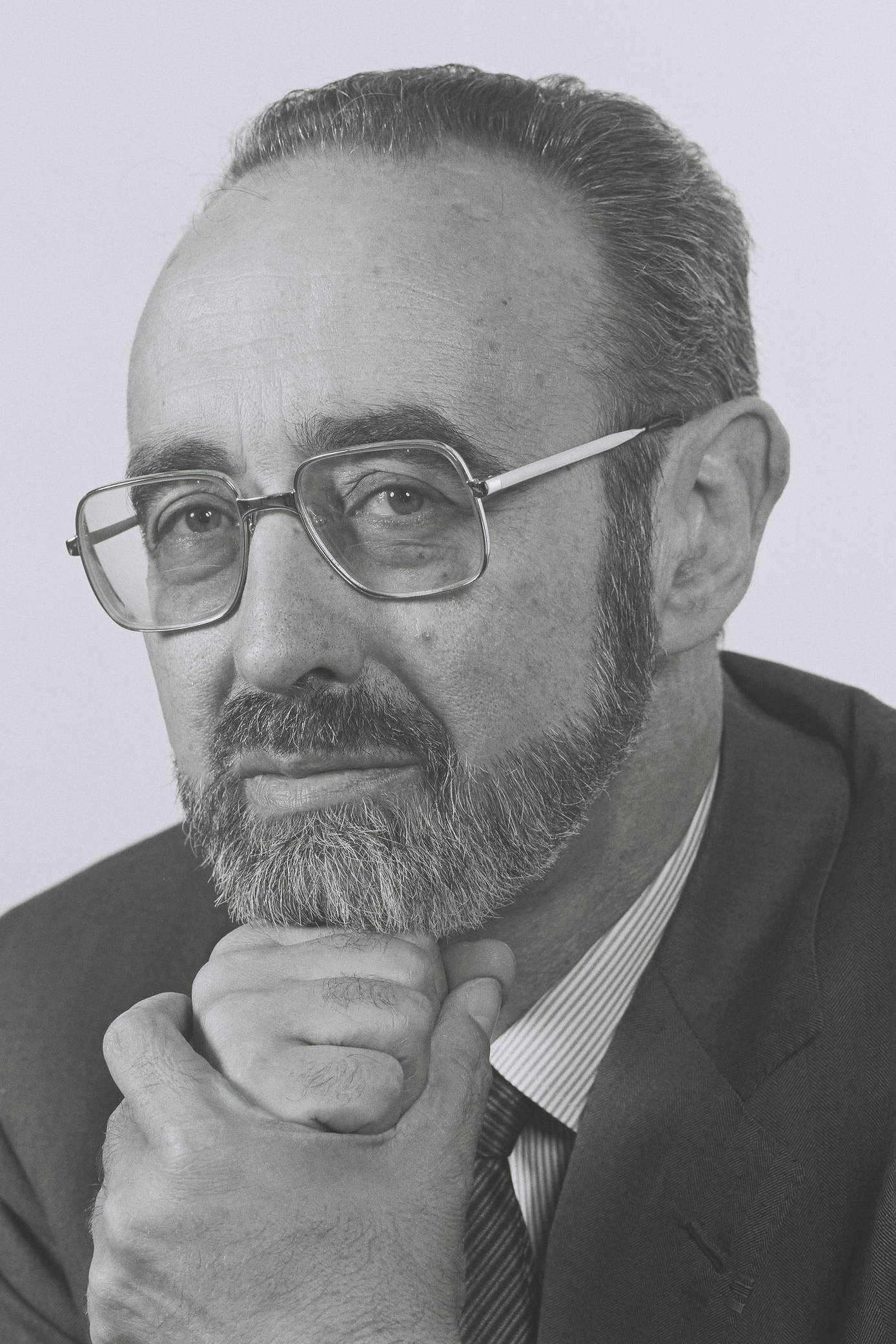
- Pisani in 1981

President of the Arab World Institute
- In office 1988–1995
- Preceded by: Paul Carton
- Succeeded by: Camille Cabana

High Commissioner of New Caledonia
- In office January 1985 – 22 May 1985
- Preceded by: Jacques Roynette
- Succeeded by: Fernand Wibaux

European Commissioner for Development
- In office 22 May 1981 – 5 January 1985
- President: Gaston Thorn
- Preceded by: Claude Cheysson
- Succeeded by: Lorenzo Natali

Minister of Agriculture
- In office 21 August 1961 – 8 January 1966
- President: Charles de Gaulle
- Preceded by: Henri Rochereau
- Succeeded by: Edgar Faure

Personal details
- Born: Edgard Pisani; 9 October 1918 Tunis, French Tunisia
- Died: 20 June 2016 (aged 97)

Edgard Edouard Pisani (French: [pizani]; 9 October 1918 – 20 June 2016) was a French statesman, philosopher, and writer.

He was a European Commissioner and Member of the European Parliament.

== Biography ==
Pisani was born in Tunis, French Tunisia, of French parents of Maltese origin. He spent his childhood in Tunisia and later studied in Paris. Pisani holds a "licence de lettres" from La Sorbonne, and a Doctorate in political science.

A résistant and significant protagonist of the Liberation of Paris in August 1944, he held positions in various governments in France: Senator (1954–1961), (1974–1981), Minister of Agriculture (1961–1966), Parliamentarian (1967–1968), European Commissioner (1981–1985), Minister of New Caledonia (1985), President of the Arab World Institute (1988–1995). In 1992, with Bertrand Hervieu, he formed the Groupe de Seillac followed in 1995 by the Groupe de Bruges, both being think tanks specialising in agricultural and rural affairs. Since 1992 he has been a member of the French Economic and Social Council. In 1993 he was awarded an Honorary Degree (Doctor of Laws) by the University of Bath. The Fonds Edgard Pisani are available in the Archives nationales of France. Pisani also served on the Agri-Energy Roundtable (AER)'s Committee of Honour, a UN-accredited non-governmental organisation chaired by US Senator Jennings Randolph (D)-WV).

He died on 20 June 2016 at the age of 97.

== Books ==
- Principes: Project de Déclaration, Librairie de Médicis, 1946.
- La Région… pour quoi faire ou le Triomphe des Jacondins, Calmann-Lévy, 1969.
- Le Général indivis, Albin Michel, 1974.
- Utopie foncière, Gallimard, 1977.
- Socialiste de raison, Flammarion, 1978.
- Défi du monde, Ramsay, 1979.
- La Main Et L'outil, Robert Laffont, 1984.
- Pour l'Afrique, Odile Jacob, 1988.
- Persiste et signe, Odile Jacob, 1992.
- "Pour une agriculture marchande et ménagère, La Tour de l'Aube", Charles Léopold Mayer, 1994.
- Entre le marché et les besoins des hommes. Agriculture et sécurité alimentaire mondiale (avec Pierre-Yves Guihéneuf), Charles Léopold Mayer, 1996.
- La Passion de L'Etat, Arléa, 1998.
- Une Certaine Idée du Monde: L'utopie comme méthode, Seuil, 2001.
- Un vieil homme et la terre, Seuil, 2004.
- Vive la révolte ! Un vieil homme et la politique, Seuil, 2006.
- Une politique mondiale pour nourrir le monde, Springer, 2007.
- Le Sens de l'État, Éditions de l'Aube, 2008.
- Mes mots: Pistes à réflexion, de l'Aube, 2013.
- Croire pour vivre: méditations politiques, Saint-Léger Éditions, 2015.

== Films ==
- 2011 – C'est beau la politique, vous savez !, by Jean Jacques Rault
