= 13th legislature of the French Fifth Republic =

The 13th legislature of the French Fifth Republic was the parliamentary cycle started in June 2007 and lasted until June 2012. It was created after the 2007 legislative election that took place on 10 and 17 June 2007. The parliamentary majority belonged to the conservative Union for a Popular Movement (UMP), and supported the François Fillon government.

== Composition ==
Party	First round			Second round			Total seats
Party	Votes	%	Seats	Votes	%	Seats	Total seats
Union for a Popular Movement	10,289,737	39.54	98	9,460,710	46.36	215	313
Socialist Party	6,436,520	24.73	1	8,624,861	42.27	185	186
UDF–Democratic Movement	1,981,107	7.61	0	100,115	0.49	3	3
National Front	1,116,136	4.29	0	17,107	0.08	0	0
French Communist Party	1,115,663	4.29	0	464,739	2.28	15	15
Miscellaneous far-left	888,250	3.41	0				0
The Greens	845,977	3.25	0	90,975	0.45	4	4
Miscellaneous right	641,842	2.47	2	238,588	1.17	7	9
Presidential majority (Note: Including New Centre, which won 20 of the 22 seats.)	616,440	2.37	8	433,057	2.12	14	22
Miscellaneous left	513,407	1.97	0	503,556	2.47	15	15
Radical Party of the Left	343,565	1.32	0	333,194	1.63	7	7
Movement for France	312,581	1.20	1				1
Miscellaneous	267,760	1.03	0	33,068	0.16	1	1
Hunting, Fishing, Nature, Traditions	213,427	0.82	0				0
Ecologists	208,456	0.80	0				0
Regionalists and separatists (Note: Seat won by the Martinican Independence Movement)	133,473	0.51	0	106,484	0.52	1	1
Miscellaneous far-right	102,124	0.39	0				0
Total	26,026,465	100.00	110	20,406,454	100.00	467	577
Valid votes	26,026,465	98.13		20,406,454	96.58		
Invalid/blank votes	495,357	1.87		722,585	3.42		
Total votes	26,521,822	100.00		21,129,039	100.00		
Registered voters/turnout	43,895,833	60.42		35,225,248	59.98		
Source: Ministry of the Interior

=== 13th Assembly by Parliamentary Group ===
Group	Leader	Parties	Seats	Caucusing	Total
UMP Group (Union pour un Mouvement Populaire)	Jean-François Copé	UMP, DVD	314	6	320
Socialist, Radical, and Citizen Group (Groupe socialiste, radical, et citoyen)	Jean-Marc Ayrault	PS, PRG, DVG, MRC	186	18	204
New Centre-Presidential Majority (Nouveau Centre-Majorité Présidentielle)	François Sauvadet	NC-PSLE, MAJ, DVD	20	3	23
Democratic and Republican Left (Gauche démocrate et républicaine)	Jean-Claude Sandrier	PCF, VEC, DVG, MIM	24	0	24
Non-Inscrits		MoDem, DLR, MPF	6	0	6
Total:			550	27	577

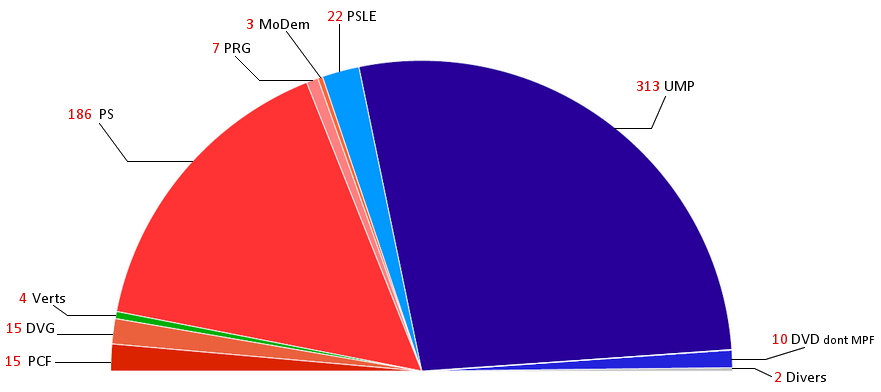
