= Cher (department) =

Department of France

Cher Char
- Department
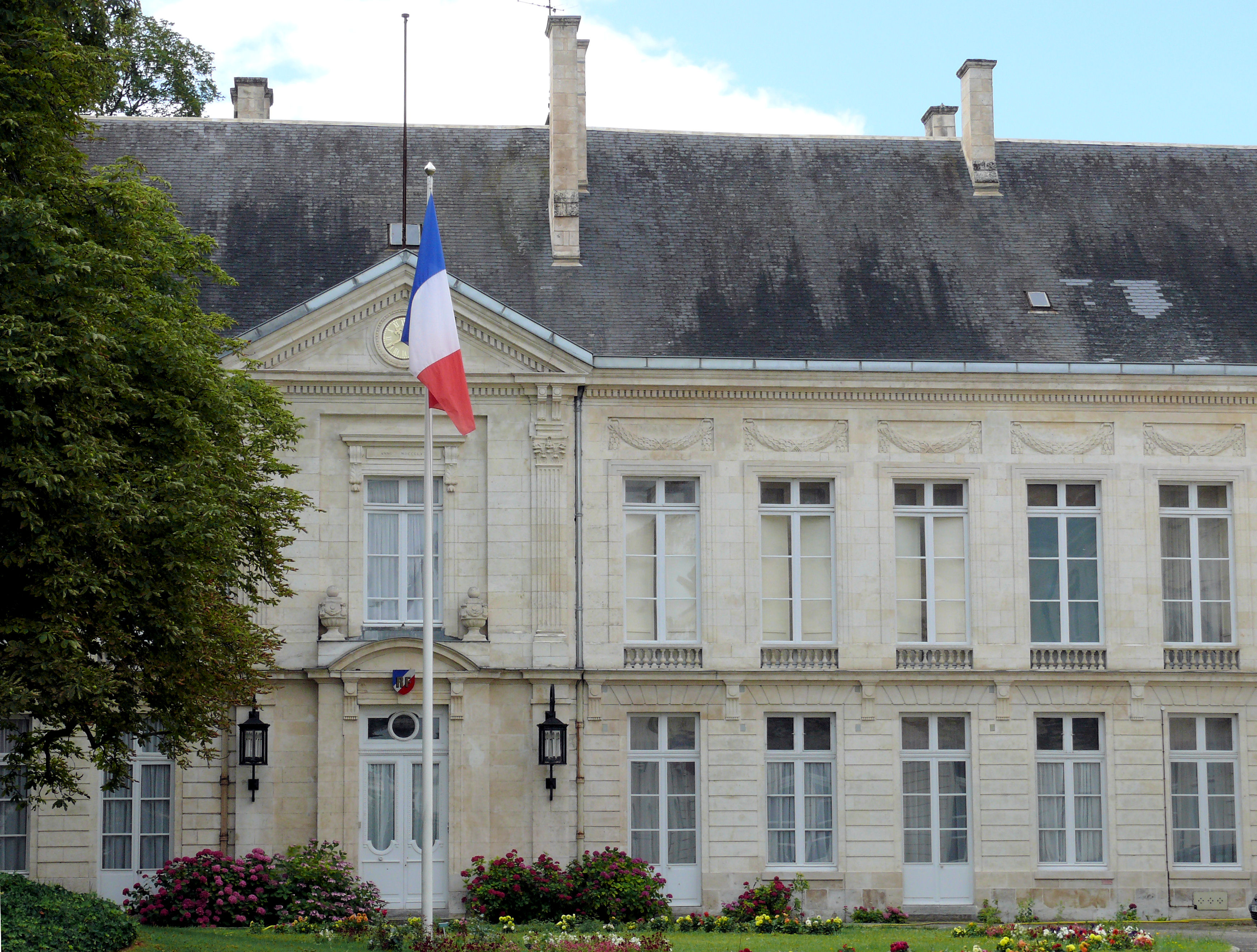
- Prefecture building in Bourges

- Flag Coat of arms

- Location of Cher in France
- Coordinates: 47°0′N 2°35′E
- Country: France
- Region: Centre-Val de Loire
- Prefecture: Bourges
- Subprefectures: Saint-Amand-Montrond; Vierzon

Government
  - President of the Departmental Council: Jacques Fleury (LR)

Area^{1}
  - Total: 7,235 km^{2} (2,793 sq mi)

Population (2023)
  - Total: 298,660
  - Rank: 76th
  - Density: 41.28/km^{2} (106.9/sq mi)
- Time zone: UTC+1 (CET)
  - Summer (DST): UTC+2 (CEST)
- Department number: 18
- Arrondissements: 3
- Cantons: 19
- Communes: 286
- ^1 French Land Register data, which exclude estuaries and lakes, ponds and glaciers larger than 1 km^{2}

Cher (/ʃɛər/ SHAIR; French: [ʃɛʁ]; Berrichon: Char) is a department in central France, part of the Centre-Val de Loire region. Named after the river Cher, its prefecture is Bourges. In 2023, it had a population of 298,660.

== History ==
Cher is one of the original 83 departments created during the French Revolution on 4 March 1790. Most of it was created, along with the adjacent department of Indre from the former province of Berry. The southeastern corner of the department, however, was part of the Duchy of Bourbon.

== Geography ==
The department is part of the current administrative region of Centre-Val de Loire. It is surrounded by the departments of Indre, Loir-et-Cher, Loiret, Nièvre, Allier, and Creuse.

=== Principal towns ===
The most populous commune is Bourges, the prefecture. As of 2023, there are 7 communes with more than 5,000 inhabitants:

Commune	Population (2023)
Bourges	64,186
Vierzon	25,068
Saint-Amand-Montrond	9,899
Saint-Doulchard	9,647
Saint-Florent-sur-Cher	6,463
Mehun-sur-Yèvre	6,380
Aubigny-sur-Nère	5,451

== Demographics ==
The inhabitants of the department are called Chériens or Berrichons in French after the former province of Berry.

Historical population

Year	Pop.	±% p.a.
1791	207,541	—
1801	217,785	+0.48%
1806	228,158	+0.93%
1821	239,561	+0.33%
1831	256,059	+0.67%
1841	273,645	+0.67%
1851	306,261	+1.13%
1861	323,393	+0.55%
1872	335,392	+0.33%
1881	351,405	+0.52%
1891	359,276	+0.22%
1901	345,543	−0.39%
1911	337,810	−0.23%
1921	304,800	−1.02%

Year	Pop.	±% p.a.
1931	293,918	−0.36%
1936	288,695	−0.36%
1946	286,070	−0.09%
1954	284,376	−0.07%
1962	293,514	+0.40%
1968	304,601	+0.62%
1975	316,350	+0.54%
1982	320,174	+0.17%
1990	321,559	+0.05%
1999	314,428	−0.25%
2007	314,599	+0.01%
2012	311,897	−0.17%
2017	304,256	−0.49%
2023	298,660	−0.31%

== Politics ==
The President of the General Council is Jacques Fleury of The Republicans, elected in July 2021.

Party		seats
	Union for a Popular Movement	10
•	Socialist Party	9
•	French Communist Party	7
	Miscellaneous Right	5
•	Miscellaneous Left	4

=== Current National Assembly representatives ===
Constituency	Member	Party
1st	François Cormier-Bouligeon	Renaissance
2nd	Nicolas Sansu	PCF
3rd	Loïc Kervran	Horizons

== Tourism ==
The Bourges Cathedral of St. Étienne is a major tourist attraction.

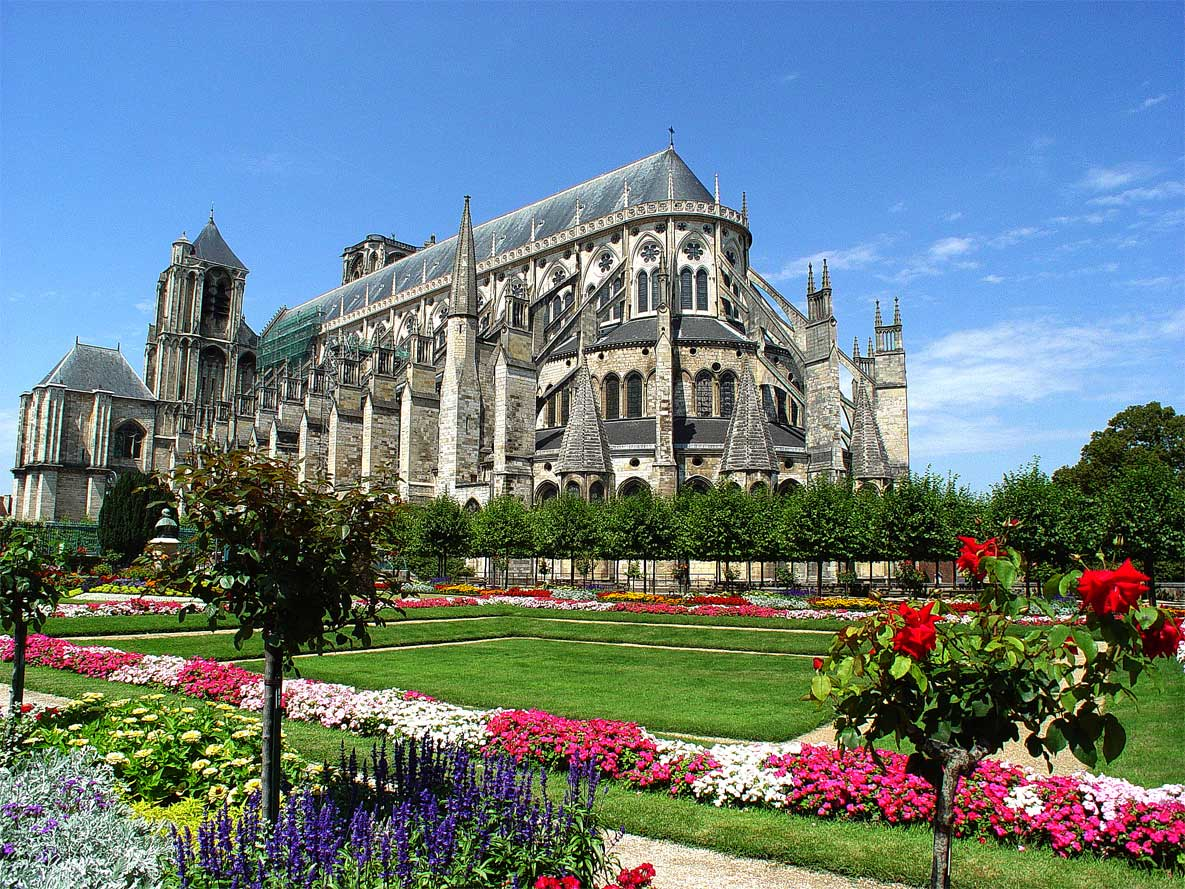
Bourges Cathedral

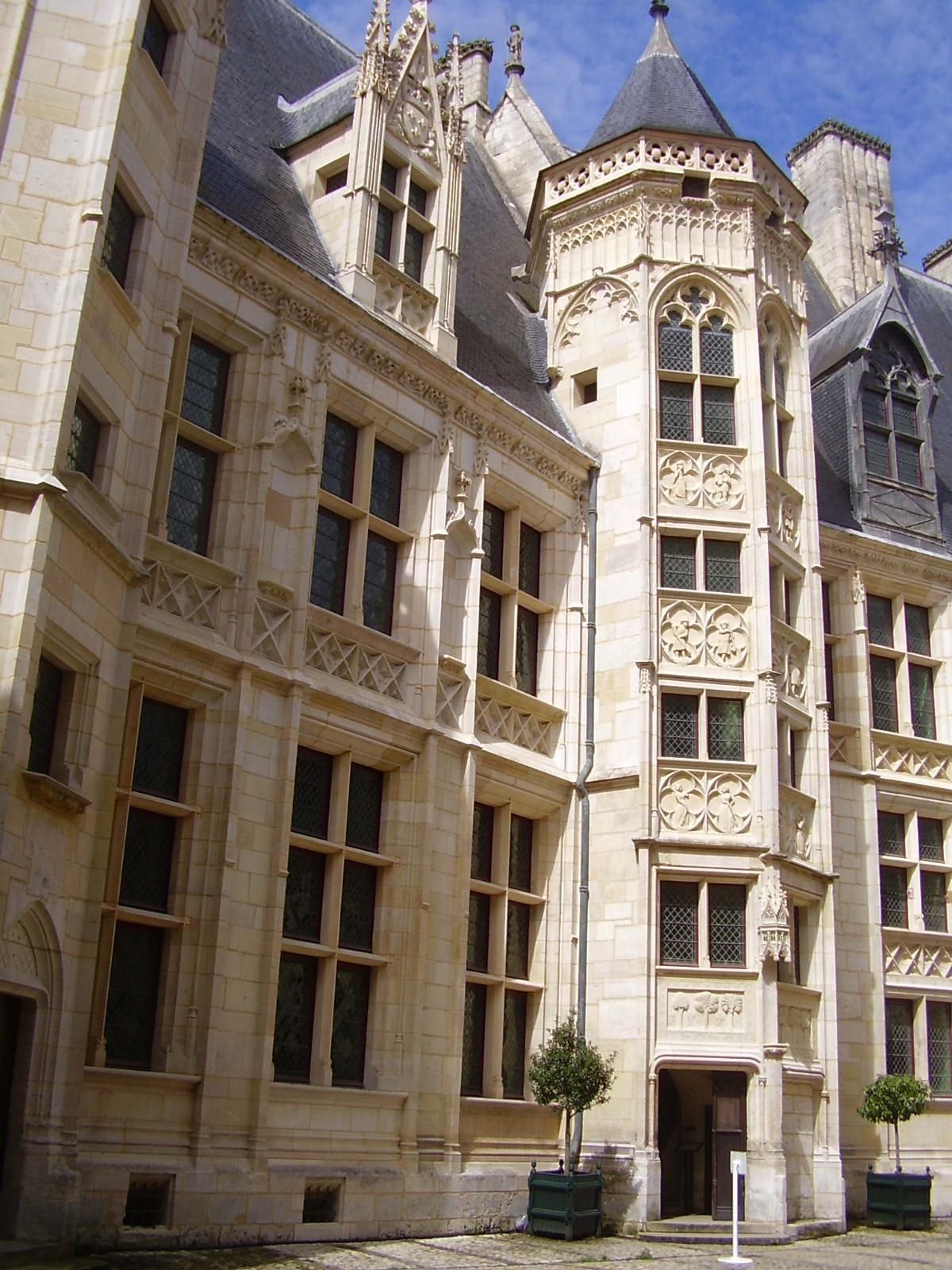
Bourges

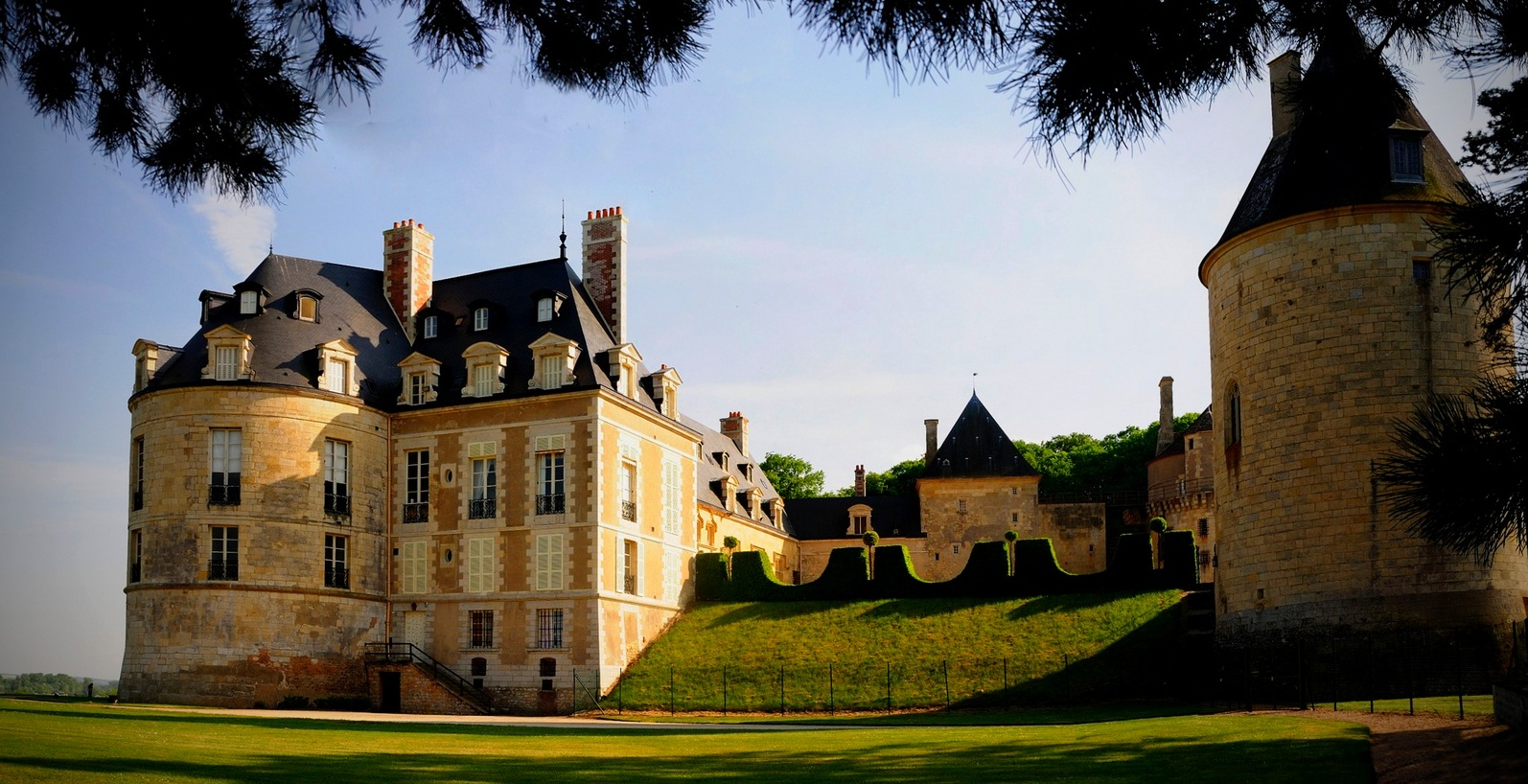
Apremont-sur-Allier

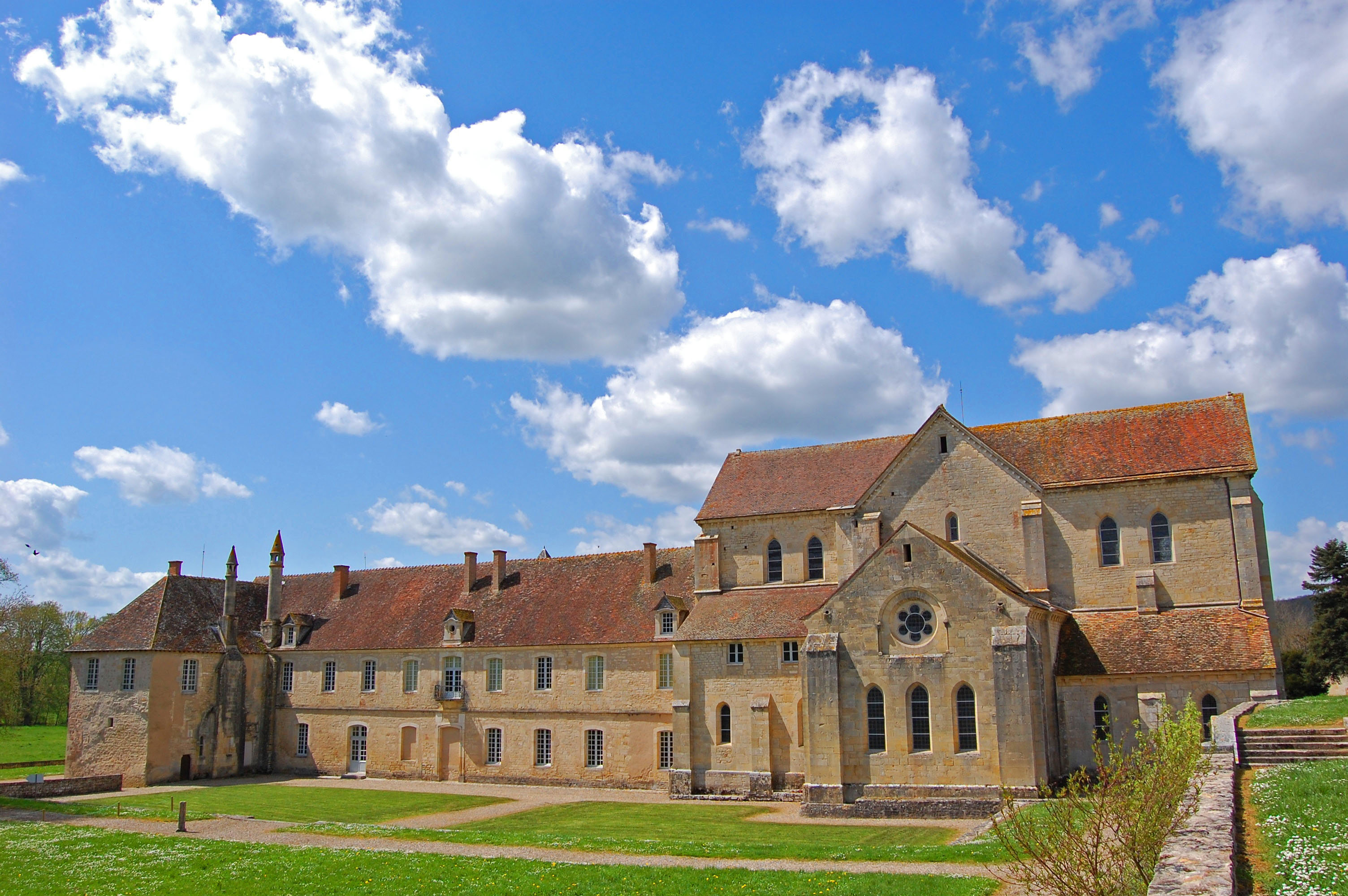
Noirlac Abbey

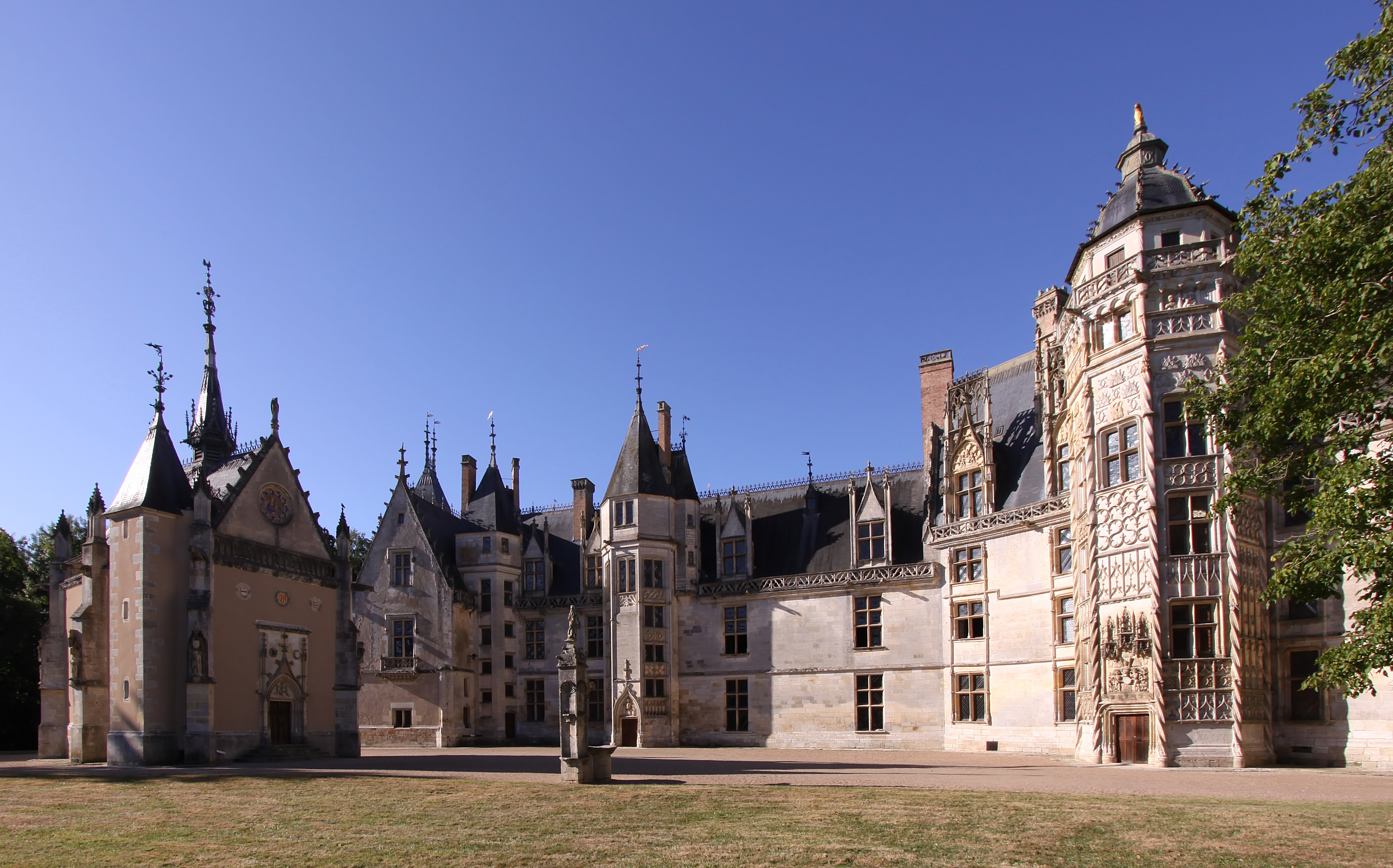
Château de Meillant

== Languages ==
The historical languages are Berrichon and the northern version of Bourbonnais. These are both dialects of French, or the Langues d'oïl. They are named respectively after the former Province of Berry and the former Duchy of Bourbon. Some 11 communes in the extreme South used to speak Occitan.

The old dialects were in widespread use until the middle decades of the twentieth century and incorporated major regional variations within the department, influenced by the dialects of adjacent regions near the departmental frontiers. During the twentieth century government educational policy promoted a more standardised version of the French language.

In the extreme south of the department influence from the southern Occitan language begins to appear, with "chambrat" being used in place of "grenier a foin" (hayloft), "betoulle" in place of "bouleau" (birch tree) and "aigue" in place of "eau" (water).

== See also ==
- Cantons of the Cher department
- Communes of the Cher department
- Arrondissements of the Cher department
