= Robert Schuman Medal =

Robert Schuman Medal or Robert Schuman Prize may refer to these prizes named after Robert Schuman, former French prime minister and a founding father of the European Union:

- Robert Schuman Medal, EPP Group, by the European People's Party
- Robert Schuman Prize, Alfred Toepfer Foundation

== See also ==
- Robert Schuman Foundation (disambiguation)
