= BRD (Germany) =

Abbreviation for the Federal Republic of Germany

BRD is an unofficial abbreviation for the Federal Republic of Germany (German: Bundesrepublik Deutschland [ˈbʊndəsʁepuˌbliːk ˈdɔʏtʃlant]), informally known in English as West Germany until 1990, and just Germany since reunification. It was occasionally used in the Federal Republic itself during the early Cold War; it was commonly used between 1968 and 1990 by the ruling party of the German Democratic Republic (East Germany), resulting in a strong deprecation of its use in West Germany. The East German government had previously used the term "German Federal Republic" (Deutsche Bundesrepublik), which it abbreviated as "DBR", to refer to West Germany. The most widely used abbreviation for West Germany in the country itself was its ISO 3166-1 alpha-2 country code "DE", which has remained the country code of reunified Germany.

While the English equivalent FRG was used as an IOC country code and a FIFA trigramme, the use of BRD was strongly discouraged by the authorities of the Federal Republic of Germany itself from the 1970s, because it was considered to be a derogatory communist term following its widespread use in East Germany since 1968; thus the term was regarded as a possible expression of an extremist, anti-constitutional and anti-democratic sentiment by West German authorities. The term was not banned by law, but its use was discouraged or forbidden in schools in West Germany from the 1970s, and treated as an error. As a result of its use by East Germany and the war on the abbreviation by the West German government, far-left groups such as the Red Army Faction tended to use the term as a way to attack West Germany; additionally the term "BRD" has been used by some far-right groups for the same purpose. After German reunification, the country is usually referred to simply as Germany (Deutschland), and hence the need for abbreviations is greatly diminished. However, since the end of the Cold War the term "BRD" has lost some of its potency as an insult intended to attack the Federal Republic of Germany, and the term "BRD" has been listed in the German dictionary Duden as an "unofficial abbreviation" for the Federal Republic of Germany since the 1990s, and is occasionally used by national newspapers across the political spectrum.

== History ==
Allied occupation zones in post-war Germany: British (green), Soviet (red), American (orange), French (blue)

=== Background ===
The official name was and is Bundesrepublik Deutschland ("Federal Republic of Germany"). The name, even though in the beginning referring only to the republic established in the Trizone, was to reflect a name for all of Germany, therefore it was particularly to include the term Deutschland ("Germany"). This corresponded to the spirit of the then West German constitution, the Basic Law, allowing all states or Länder, then under Allied control, to join the new Federal Republic. In 1949 the original eleven states in the Trizone and West Berlin did so. However the latter was prevented by Allied objection on account of the city being a quadripartite allied occupation area. The Saarland joined with effect from 1 January 1957, while the "new states" of the East did so with effect from 3 October 1990, including reunited Berlin.

Therefore, the term Germany had an importance as part of the official name, which is reflected in the naming conventions which developed in the Cold War. Starting in June 1949 the abbreviation was sometimes used in the Federal Republic of Germany without any special connotations. The initialism BRD began to enter into such regular usage in West German scientific and ministerial circles, that it was added to the western edition of the German language dictionary Duden in 1967. The German Democratic Republic at first used the name Westdeutschland or "West Germany" (abbreviated "WD") for the Federal Republic of Germany, but since the 1950s the East German government insisted on calling West Germany Deutsche Bundesrepublik or "German Federal Republic" (abbreviated "DBR"), because they also considered East Germany part of Germany, and thus would not permit the West German government to use the name "Germany".

=== Use in East Germany ===
This changed in 1968 with the new constitution of the German Democratic Republic. The communists no longer strove for German reunification, and the name BRD was introduced as a propaganda counter-term to the term DDR, trying to express the equality of the states. The West would speak of the sogenannte DDR or "so-called 'DDR'" when intending to belittle East German statehood.

At that time, the initialism BRD had been adopted by Neues Deutschland, the ruling Socialist Unity Party's daily newspaper, while East German official sources adopted that initialism as standard in 1973.

The East German decision to abandon the idea of a single German nation was accompanied by omitting the terms Deutschland ("Germany") and deutsch ("German") in a number of terms, for example:

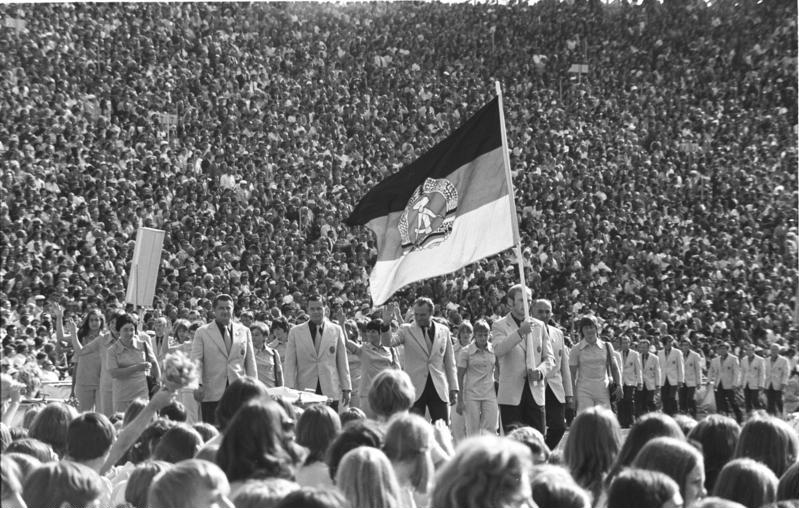
East German team at the opening ceremony of the 1972 Summer Olympics

- The governing National Front of Democratic Germany became the National Front of the German Democratic Republic in 1973
- The words of the national anthem, Auferstanden aus Ruinen, which referred to Deutschland, einig Vaterland ("Germany, united fatherland") ceased to be sung following Erich Honecker succeeding Walter Ulbricht as party leader in 1971
- The state television service, Deutscher Fernsehfunk became "Fernsehen der DDR" in 1972, its radio counterpart having always been called Rundfunk der DDR or "Radio of the GDR"
- The North German Plain, covering the north of East and West Germany, appeared in East German atlases as Nördliches Tiefland der DDR (Northern Plain of the GDR).
- The GDR sent a separate team to the 1972 Summer Olympics, at which its flag and anthem were used for the first time Until 1959, the GDR had used an identical flag to that of the Federal Republic, before adopting a version with the national emblem in the centre.

However, the ruling party's full name, Sozialistische Einheitspartei Deutschlands or "Socialist Unity Party of Germany" remained unchanged, as did that of its newspaper Neues Deutschland ("New Germany") .

DDR international vehicle registration oval, used between 1974 and 1990

Therefore, using the abbreviation BRD fitted perfectly into the official East German policy of downplaying the concept of a united Germany. In 1974, the GDR had replaced the vehicle registration code D, hitherto shared with the Federal Republic, for DDR and demanded that West Germany recognise the division by likewise accepting BRD. This was rejected by the West, where some motorists displayed bumper stickers with the slogan BRD - Nein Danke! ("BRD? No Thanks!"). Thus in the West the initialism became even more objectionable and using it was often considered either unreflecting or even expressing naïve Communist sympathies.

As a result, the initialism reached only occasional frequency in West German parlance. In order to be precise West Germans increasingly used the terms Bundesrepublik or Bundesgebiet ("Federal Republic", or "Federal Territory") to refer to the country and Bundesbürger ("Federal Citizen[s]") as to its citizens, with the pertaining adjective bundesdeutsch (federally German).

=== Opposition to use in West Germany ===
To distance themselves from the term BRD, until German reunification, the government of the Federal Republic of Germany and media sometimes used the abbreviations BR Deutschland, BR-Dt., BRDt., BR Dtld. or simply Dtld. After the newly established states of the German Democratic Republic acceded to the Federal Republic, Deutschland ("Germany") has always been used as the official short name.

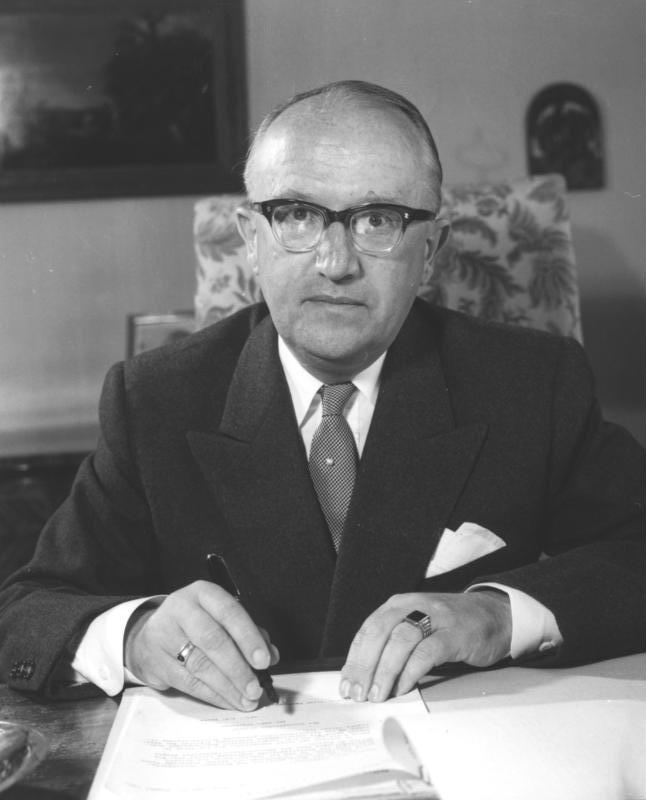
Walter Hallstein

West Germany had always claimed to be the Germany, and did not like the comparison to DDR, or two separate German states. This claim was also reflected in the Hallstein Doctrine determining its foreign and interior policy until the early 1970s. Named after Walter Hallstein, State secretary at the Foreign Office, this was a key doctrine in the foreign policy of West Germany after 1955, which prescribed that the Federal Republic of Germany would not establish or maintain diplomatic relations with any state that recognised the GDR. Although this changed after 1973, with the Federal Republic no longer asserting an exclusive mandate over the whole of Germany, West Germany only established de facto diplomatic relations with East Germany. Under the terms of the Basic Treaty in 1972, Bonn and East Berlin exchanged "permanent missions", headed by "permanent representatives", rather than de jure embassies headed by ambassadors. Similarly, relations with the GDR were not conducted through the Foreign Office, but through a separate Federal Ministry for Intra-German Relations, to which the East German mission was accredited.

In 1965 the Federal Minister of All-German Affairs (later Intra-German Relations) issued the Directives for the appellation of Germany recommending that the use of BRD be avoided. On 31 May 1974 the heads of the federal and state governments recommended that the full name should always be used in official publications. In November 1979 the federal government informed the Bundestag that the West German public broadcasters ARD and ZDF agreed not to use the initialism.

Under the West German federal system, the states were generally responsible for school education, and by the 1970s, some of them had either already recommended omitting the initialism, or, in the case of Bavaria, forbidden it. Similarly, a decree by the educational authorities in the state of Schleswig-Holstein of 4 October 1976 declared the term to be nicht wünschenswert or "undesirable". The conference of all the states ministers for school education decided on 12 February 1981 to not print the initialism in books, maps, and atlases for schools. with pupils being required to write Bundesrepublik Deutschland in full and use of the term being deemed an error. The different usages were so ingrained that one could deduce a person's or source's political leaning from the name used for West Germany, with far-left movements in the country using BRD.

However, as the Association for the German Language found, this debate on the initialism had little influence on changing the West German parlance with the usage of the initialism - in any event limited - unaffected by the debate.

== Naming difficulties over Berlin and East Germany ==
Map of divided Berlin, indicating by the broken line at Berlin's western border the territorial redeployment decided by the Allies

A similar ideological question was the question whether to use "Berlin (West)" (the officially preferred name) or "West Berlin", and even whether to write "West Berlin" in German as two hyphenated words - West-Berlin - or as one word - Westberlin.

Most Westerners called the Western sectors "Berlin", unless further distinction was necessary. The West German Federal government initially called West Berlin Groß-Berlin or "Greater Berlin", but changed this "Berlin (West)", although it also used the hyphenated "West-Berlin". However, the East German government commonly referred to it as "Westberlin". Starting from 31 May 1961, East Berlin was officially called Berlin, Hauptstadt der DDR (Berlin, Capital of the GDR), replacing the formerly used term Democratic Berlin, or simply "Berlin", by East Germany, and "Berlin (Ost)" by the West German Federal government. Other names used by West German media included Ost-Berlin and Ostberlin (both meaning "East Berlin") as well as Ostsektor or "Eastern Sector". These different naming conventions for the divided parts of Berlin, when followed by individuals, governments, or media, commonly indicated their political leanings, with the centre-right Frankfurter Allgemeine Zeitung using "Ost-Berlin" and the centre-left Süddeutsche Zeitung using "Ostberlin".

The naming of the German Democratic Republic was also a controversial issue, West Germans at first preferring the names Mitteldeutschland ("Middle Germany") or Sowjetische Besatzungszone ("Soviet Occupation Zone"; abbreviated SBZ). This changed under the Ostpolitik of Willy Brandt when West German authorities started using the official name, Deutsche Demokratische Republik or DDR, but many conservative German newspapers, like Bild, owned by the Springer company, always wrote "DDR" in scare quotes until 1 August 1989.

== Similar naming difficulties ==
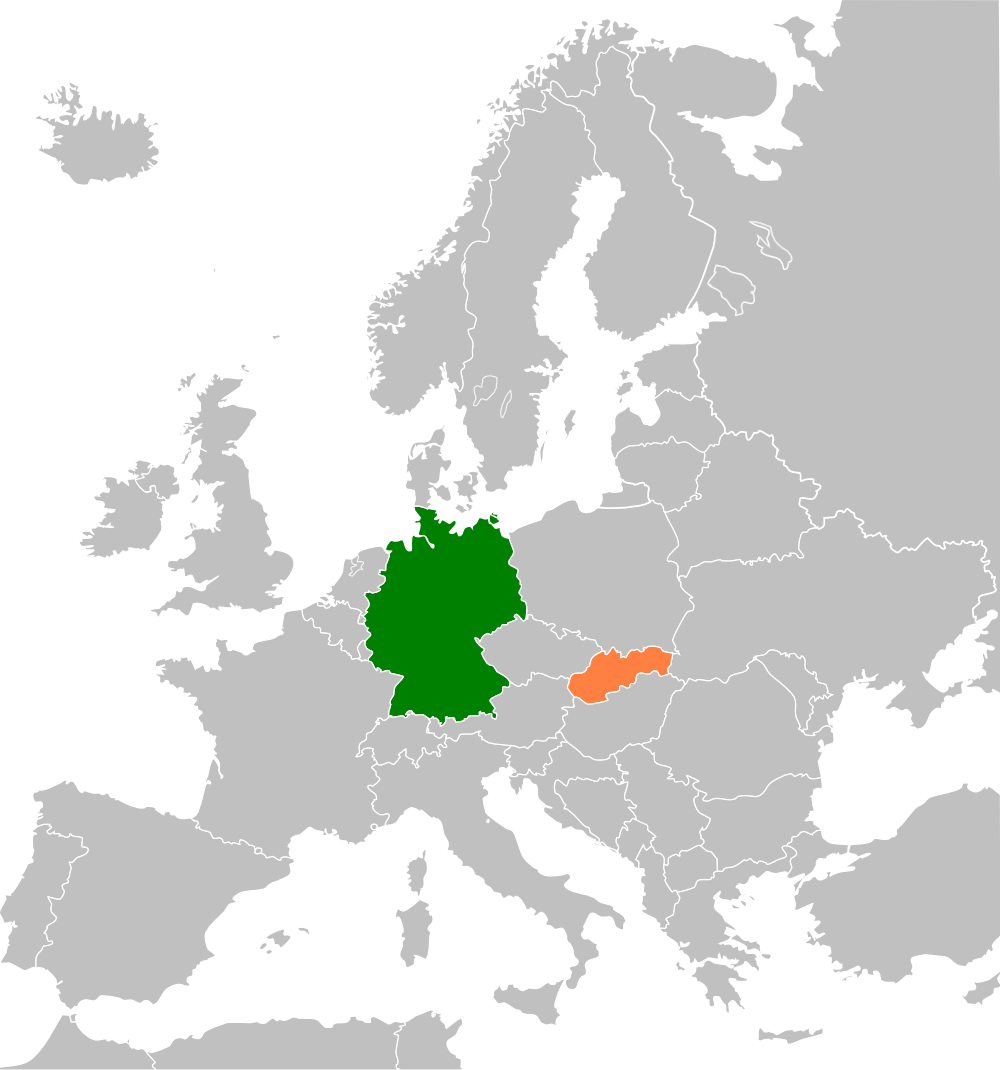
Germany (green) and Slovakia (orange)

In 1995, a disagreement arose between reunified Germany and newly independent Slovakia, as Germany objected to the use of the Slovak language name Nemecká spolková republika (literally "German Federal Republic") owing to its Cold War connotations, instead of Spolková republika Nemecko. This was almost identical to the equivalent Spolková republika Německo in Czech, a language closely related to Slovak, but the Slovak authorities claimed that "Federal Republic of Germany" could not be translated grammatically into Slovak. However, the Slovak government had used it until the previous year, leading to suggestions in the Bratislava newspaper Narodna Obroda that they were using "German Federal Republic" to show their displeasure with German attitudes to the country.
