= Walter Hallstein =

German diplomat and statesman (1901–1982)

His Excellency Walter Hallstein
- Hallstein in 1958

President of the European Commission
- In office 7 January 1958 – 30 June 1967
- First Vice-President: Sicco Mansholt
- Preceded by: Position established
- Succeeded by: Jean Rey

State Secretary at the Federal Foreign Office
- In office 2 April 1951 – 7 January 1958
- Preceded by: Position established
- Succeeded by: Hilger van Scherpenberg

Member of the Bundestag
- In office 28 September 1969 – 19 November 1972
- Constituency: Neuwied

Personal details
- Born: Walther [sic] Peter Hallstein (Note: According to his birth certificate he was named Walther [sic] Peter Hallstein. He was the second of two sons of Anna Hallstein (née Geibel) and Jakob (or Jacob) Hallstein, a senior civil-servant for the railway authority with the rank of Regierungsbaurat.); 17 November 1901 Mainz, Hesse and by Rhine, German Empire
- Died: 29 March 1982 (aged 80) Stuttgart, Baden-Württemberg, West Germany
- Resting place: Waldfriedhof Cemetery, Stuttgart
- Party: Christian Democratic Union
- Education: Friedrich Wilhelm University of Berlin

Military service
- Allegiance: Nazi Germany
- Branch/service: Wehrmacht
- Years of service: 1942–1945
- Rank: Oberleutnant
- Battles/wars: World War II: German occupation of France; Normandy Campaign; Battle of Cherbourg
- Walter Hallstein's voice Hallstein delivering New Year's greetings to foreign ambassadors Recorded 31 January 1963

Walter Hallstein (17 November 1901 – 29 March 1982) was a German academic, diplomat and statesman who was the first president of the Commission of the European Economic Community and one of the founding fathers of the European Union.

Hallstein began his academic career in the 1920s Weimar Republic and became Germany's youngest law professor in 1930, at the age of 29. During World War II he served as a First Lieutenant in the German Army in France. Captured by American troops in 1944, he spent the rest of the war in a prisoner-of-war camp in the United States, where he organised a "camp university" for his fellow soldiers. After the war he returned to Germany and continued his academic career; he became rector of the University of Frankfurt in 1946 and spent a year as a visiting professor at Georgetown University from 1948. In 1950 he was recruited to a diplomatic career, becoming the leading civil servant at the German Foreign Office, where he gave his name to the Hallstein Doctrine, West Germany's policy of isolating East Germany diplomatically.

A keen advocate of a federal Europe, Hallstein played a key role in West German foreign policy and then in European integration. He was one of the architects of the European Coal and Steel Community and the first President of the Commission of the European Economic Community, which would later become the European Union. He held the office from 1958 to 1967 and was the only German to be selected as president of the European Commission or its predecessors until the selection of Ursula von der Leyen in 2019. Hallstein famously described his role as "a kind of European prime minister" and dismissed national sovereignty as a "doctrine of yesteryear."

Hallstein left office following a clash with the President of France, Charles de Gaulle; he turned to German politics as a member of the Bundestag, also serving as President of the European Movement from 1968 to 1974. He is the author of books and numerous articles and speeches on European integration and on the European Communities.

== Early life and pre-war academic career ==
Walter Hallstein was born on 17 November 1901 in Mainz, Germany. After primary school in Darmstadt he attended a classical school (Note: The Rabanus-Maurus-Gymnasium.) in Mainz from 1913 until his matriculation (Abitur) in 1920.

From 1920, Hallstein studied law at the University of Bonn, later moving to the Ludwig-Maximilians-Universität München and then to the Friedrich Wilhelm University of Berlin. He specialized in international private law and wrote his doctoral dissertation on commercial aspects of the 1919 Treaty of Versailles. (Note: The topic of Hallstein's doctoral dissertation was life insurance policies in the Treaty of Versailles ("Der Lebensversicherungvertrag im Versailler Vertrag").) He obtained his doctorate from the Friedrich Wilhelm University of Berlin in 1925 – at the age of 23. From 1923 to 1926, he was a legal clerk at the Kammergericht, and in 1927, having passed his qualifying examination, he was employed for a very brief spell as a judge. He then worked as an academic (Note: As a wissenschaftlicher Referent.) at the Kaiser Wilhelm Institute for Foreign Private and International Private Law in Berlin, where he specialized in comparative commercial and company law, working under Professor Martin Wolff, a leading scholar of private law. He would remain there until 1930. In 1929 he obtained his Habilitation (Note: Habilitation, a post-doctoral qualification, entitles a person to teach independently and to supervise doctoral dissertations) from the Friedrich Wilhelm University of Berlin, based on a thesis on company law. (Note: The thesis was entitled Die Aktienrechte der Gegenwart [Contemporary Company Law in Different Jurisdictions] and was published in 1931.) In 1930, at the age of 29, he was appointed professor of private law and company law at the University of Rostock, making him Germany's youngest professor of law. He was made Deputy Dean (Prodekan) of the Faculty of Law in 1935 and then Dean in 1936. He remained in Rostock until 1941. From 1941 to 1944, Hallstein lectured at the University of Frankfurt am Main, where he was Director of the Institute for Comparative Law and Economic Law.

In 1935, Hallstein attempted to start a military career alongside his academic duties. In 1936, he managed to integrate a voluntary military service in an artillery unit. In the years between 1936 and 1939, he attended several military courses and was made a reserve officer.

Hallstein was a member of several nominally Nazi professional organizations, (Note: These included the National Socialist Teachers League (Nationalsozialistischer Lehrerbund), the National Socialist Association of Legal Professionals (NS-Rechtswahrerbund ), the National Socialist People's Welfare organization (Nationalsozialistische Volkswohlfahrt), the National Socialist German Lecturers League (Nationalsozialistischer Deutscher Dozentenbund), and the National Socialist Air-Raid Protection Association (Nationalsozialistischer Luftschutzbund). The backdrop to this was the Nazi seizure of control of civil servants' associations and many other professional and civic organizations in what they called Gleichschaltung (synchronization or alignment); so being a member of a professional association entailed membership in a nominally Nazi association.) but he was not a member of the Nazi Party or of the SA. He is reputed to have rejected Nazi ideology and to have kept his distance from the Nazis. There was opposition from Nazi officials to his proposed appointment, in 1941, as professor of law at the University of Frankfurt am Main, but the academics pushed through his candidacy, and he soon advanced to become dean of the faculty.

== Soldier and prisoner of war (1942–1945) ==
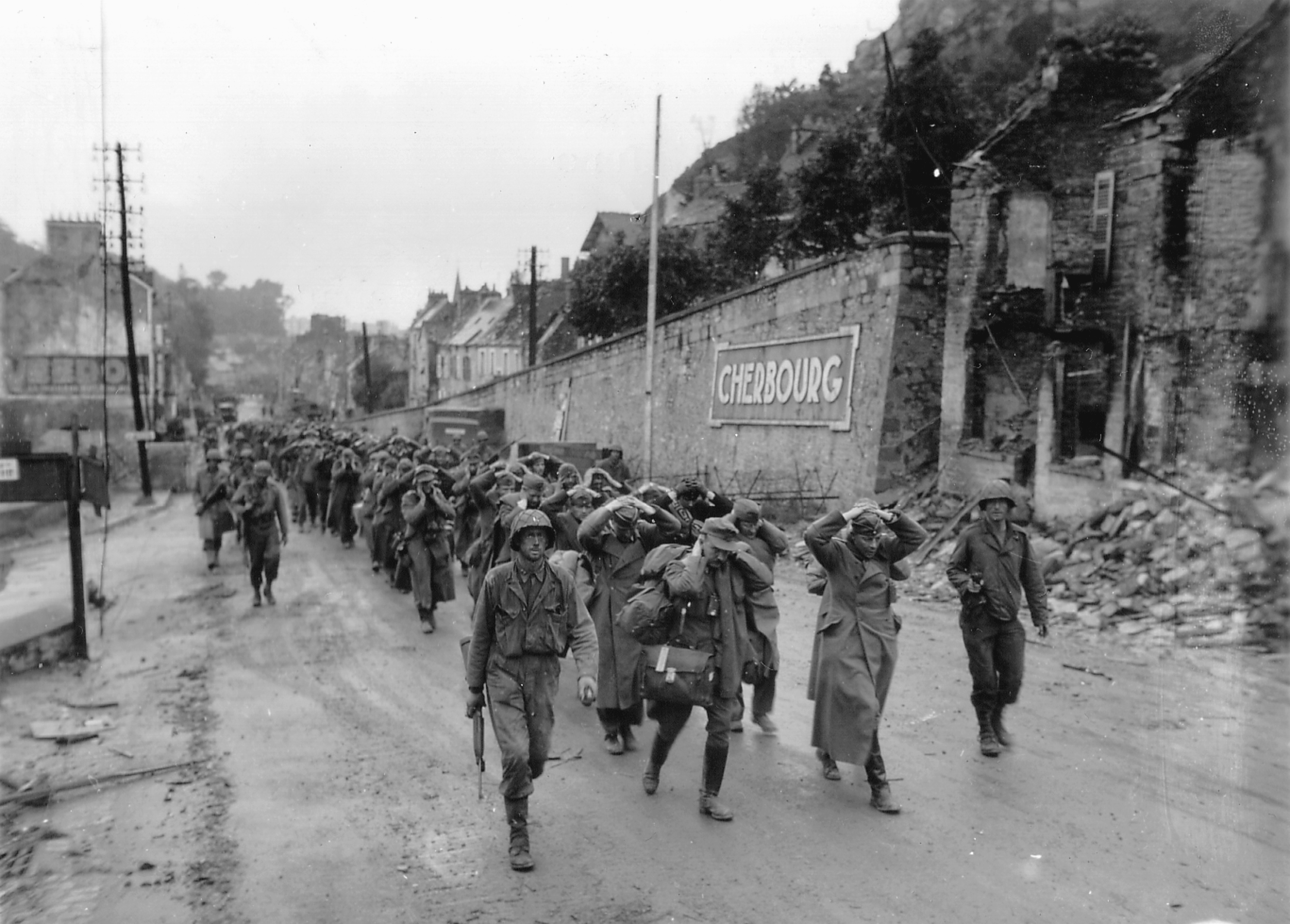
Hallstein was taken prisoner by American troops in Cherbourg in 1944.

In 1942, Hallstein was called up; he served in an artillery regiment of the Wehrmacht in Northern France with the rank of first lieutenant (Oberleutnant). (Note: He served as an assistant adjutant (Ordonnanzoffizier)) In early 1944, Hallstein's name was submitted by the University of Frankfurt am Main as a potential Nationalsozialistischer Führungsoffizier to the National Socialist Lecturers League. On 26 June 1944, during the Battle of Cherbourg, he was captured by the Americans and sent to Camp Como, a prisoner-of-war camp in Mississippi.

As a German prisoner of war (POW) in the United States, Hallstein started a "camp university", where he held law courses for the prisoners. As part of the Sunflower Project, a project to re-educate German POWs, he attended an "administrative school" at Fort Getty, where teaching included the principles of the Constitution of the United States. Hallstein remained a prisoner of war from June 1944 to mid-1945.

== Post-war academic career (1945–1950) ==
In November 1945, Hallstein returned to Germany, where he campaigned for the University of Frankfurt am Main to be re-opened. Turning down an offer from Ludwig Erhard to be deputy minister at the Bavarian Ministry of Economics, he became a professor at the University of Frankfurt am Main on 1 February 1946, and in April he was elected its rector, a position he retained until 1948. He was president of the South German Rectors' Conference, which he founded. From 1948 to 1949, he spent a year as visiting professor at Georgetown University in Washington D.C.

Hallstein was co-founder of the German national UNESCO committee and was its president from 1949 to 1950.

== Diplomatic career (1950–1957) ==
=== Foreign affairs at the Chancellery (1950–1951) ===
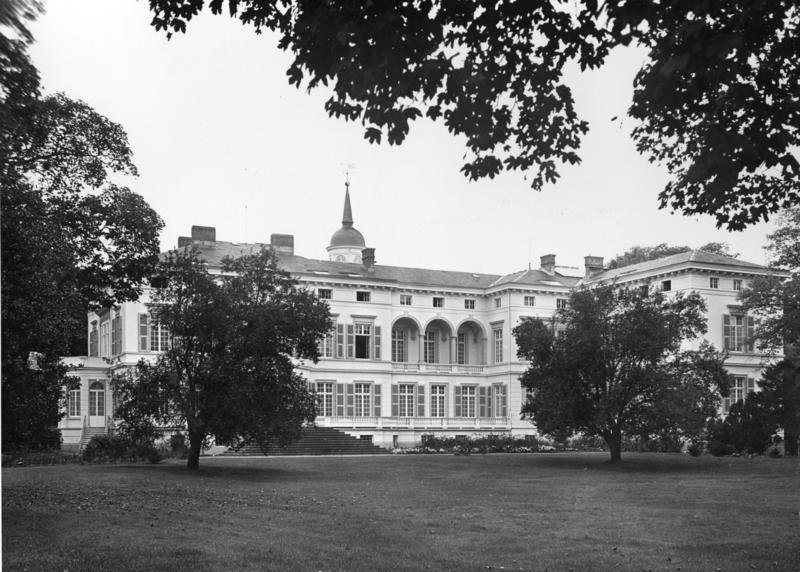
The Palais Schaumburg (1950), seat of the Federal Chancellery in 1950, where Hallstein worked before the German Foreign Office was formed

Against the background of the Second World War, a conflict that had caused massive destruction and left the continent split in two by the Iron Curtain, there were calls for increased cooperation in Europe. The French foreign minister, Robert Schuman, put forward a plan, originating from Jean Monnet, for a European Coal and Steel Community that would unify control of German and French coal and steel production, and talks were started with this aim. Germany had still not regained its sovereignty following defeat in World War II, and was represented internationally by the Allied High Commission. There was no German foreign office and, for a time, foreign affairs were dealt with by the Chancellery.

Konrad Adenauer, the German Chancellor, called Hallstein to Bonn, at the suggestion of Wilhelm Röpke, and in June 1950 he appointed him to head the German delegation at the Schuman Plan negotiations in Paris, which were to lead to the formation of the European Coal and Steel Community. Jean Monnet, the leader of the French delegation, and Hallstein drew up the Schuman Plan, which was the basis for the European Coal and Steel Community (ECSC), established by the Treaty of Paris in 1951. The ECSC was to develop into the European Economic Community, and later the European Union. In August 1950, to general surprise, Hallstein was made head of the Office of Foreign Affairs (Dienststelle für auswärtige Angelegenheiten) at the Federal Chancellery (Kanzleramt). At this time, little was known about Hallstein, except that he had not been a member of the Nazi Party and that he was on good terms with US officials.

=== State Secretary at the Foreign Office (1951–1958) ===
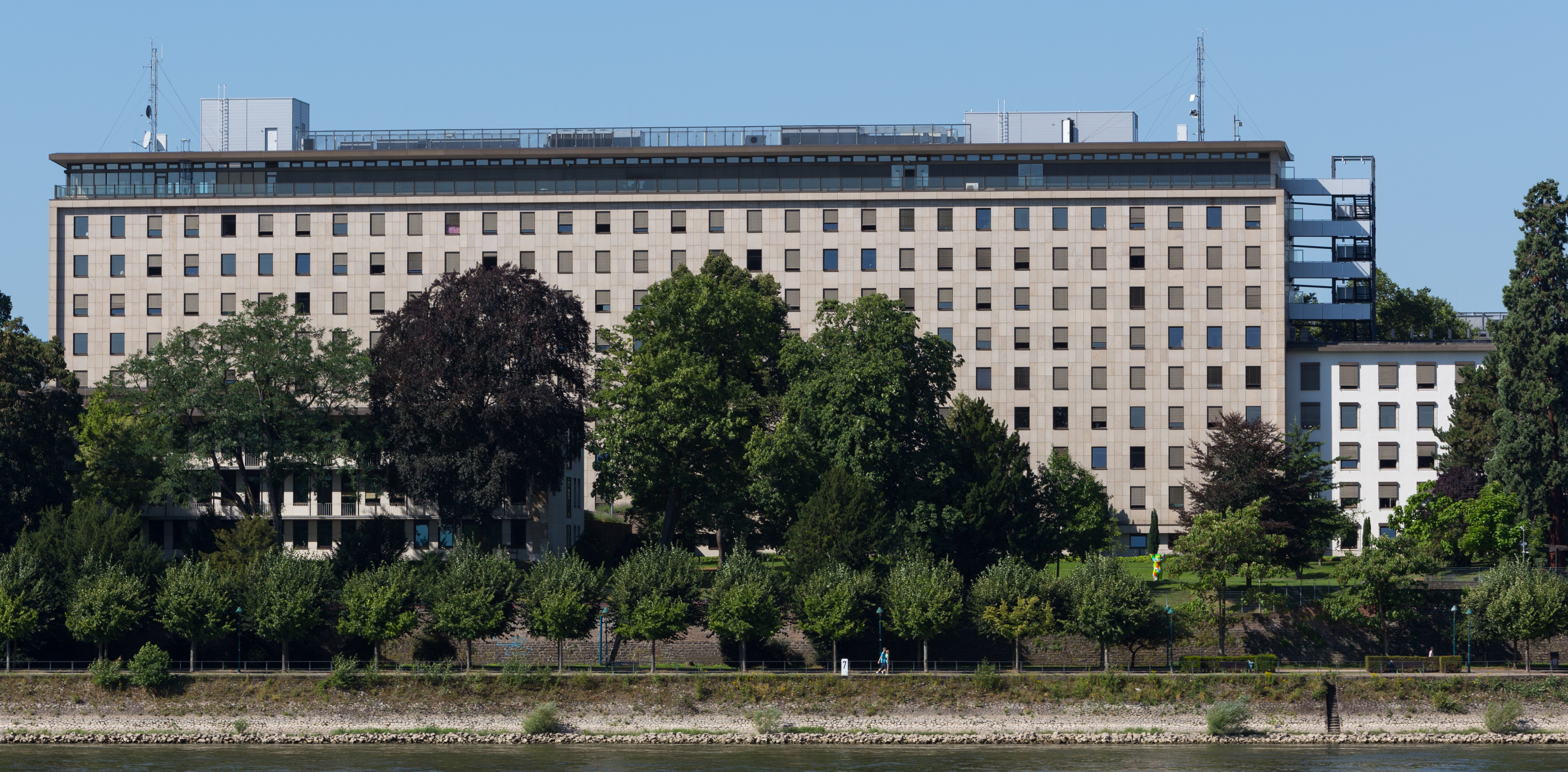
1955 German Foreign Office building

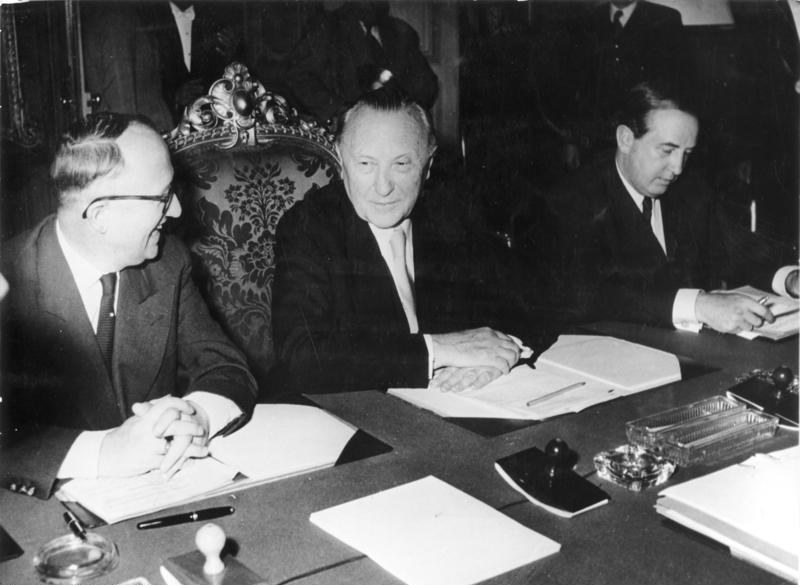
West Germany joins NATO: Walter Hallstein (left) with Konrad Adenauer (centre) and Ambassador Herbert Blankenhorn (right) at the NATO Conference in Paris in 1954.

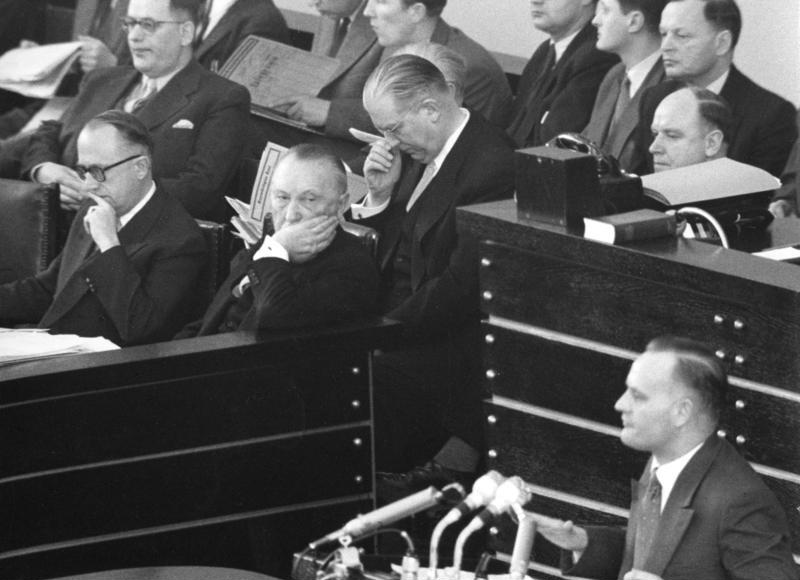
Second reading of the Paris Treaties in the Bundestag on 25 February 1955

Following a change in the Occupation Statute, the German Foreign Office was re-created in March 1951, (Note: The date was 15 March 1951.) but the post of Foreign Minister was filled by Adenauer himself. On 2 April 1951, Hallstein was made the leading civil servant at the newly created Foreign Office. Foreign policy continued to be managed by Adenauer himself with his group of intimates, including Hallstein, Blankenhorn and others. In many respects, Hallstein was the West German Foreign Minister in all but name, but there was a growing awareness that a separate officeholder was needed. Adenauer is said to have considered Hallstein for the position, even though he was not a member of a political party.

Hallstein also played an important part in promoting West Germany's goals of regaining sovereignty and creating a European Defence Community (EDC), of which West Germany would be a member. Negotiations at first resulted in two international agreements:

- On 26 May 1952, the Treaty of Bonn was signed by the United States, United Kingdom, France, and West Germany; on ratification, it would largely restore sovereignty to the Federal Republic of Germany (de facto West Germany, but not including West Berlin, which retained a special status).
- On 27 May 1952, the Treaty of Paris was signed by the United States, France, Italy, Belgium, Netherlands, Luxembourg, and West Germany; on ratification, it would have established the European Defence Community (EDC).

However, the Treaty of Paris failed to obtain the necessary approval of the French Parliament. Instead, a solution involving the Western European Union (WEU) was agreed upon, and West Germany was to become a member of NATO. The efforts to resolve the issues culminated, in 1954, in a series of conferences in London and Paris. The German side was represented by Adenauer, the German chancellor, together with the top civil servants at the German Foreign Office: Hallstein, his colleague Blankenhorn, and his deputy, Grewe. Hallstein helped negotiate various treaties at the London Nine-Power Conference from 23 September to 3 October 1954; they were finalized at the Paris conference from 20 to 23 October 1954. The conferences in Paris included a meeting of the parties to the Nine-Power Conference in London (20 October), a meeting of the seven WEU members (20 October), a meeting of the Four Powers to end the occupation of Germany (21–22 October), and a meeting of all fourteen NATO members to approve Germany's membership.

After the ratification of the Paris Accords on 5 May 1955, the General Treaty (Deutschlandvertrag), which largely restored (West) German (Note: The two entities officially using the names Federal Republic of Germany and German Democratic Republic were, at this time, generally known in the English-speaking world as West Germany and East Germany, respectively. However, for much of the time, the Federal Republic of Germany claimed to represent the whole of Germany, and this was generally acknowledged by its allies and reflected in the language of international treaties. This should be borne in mind when any of these terms is used, since any term may be taken imply a point of view but it is not possible to avoid all problematic terms. For details, see Hallstein Doctrine.) sovereignty, took full effect; the Federal Republic of Germany became a member of NATO.

Once the major foreign policy objectives were in hand, Hallstein set about restoring Germany's diplomatic service and re-organizing the Foreign Office, based on the findings of the Maltzan Report, a report commissioned by Hallstein on 26 June 1952 and produced a month later by Vollrath Freiherr von Maltzan, a former diplomat, at that time on loan from the Ministry of Economics.

There was criticism of a lack of information and consultation and an atmosphere of secrecy, possibly resulting from Adenauer's distrust of the old hands at the Foreign Office, the Wilhelmstraße veterans, as well as the desire to fill top jobs with outsiders not tainted by having served as diplomats under the Nazis. There were suggestions of a disconnect between the leadership (consisting of Adenauer and a small group of close advisers, including Hallstein and Blankenhorn) on the one hand and the division leaders at the Foreign Office and the diplomatic missions on the other. In particular, Hallstein was also criticised in the press after the European Defence Community was rejected by the French National Assembly, as had been predicted by the German diplomatic mission in Paris.

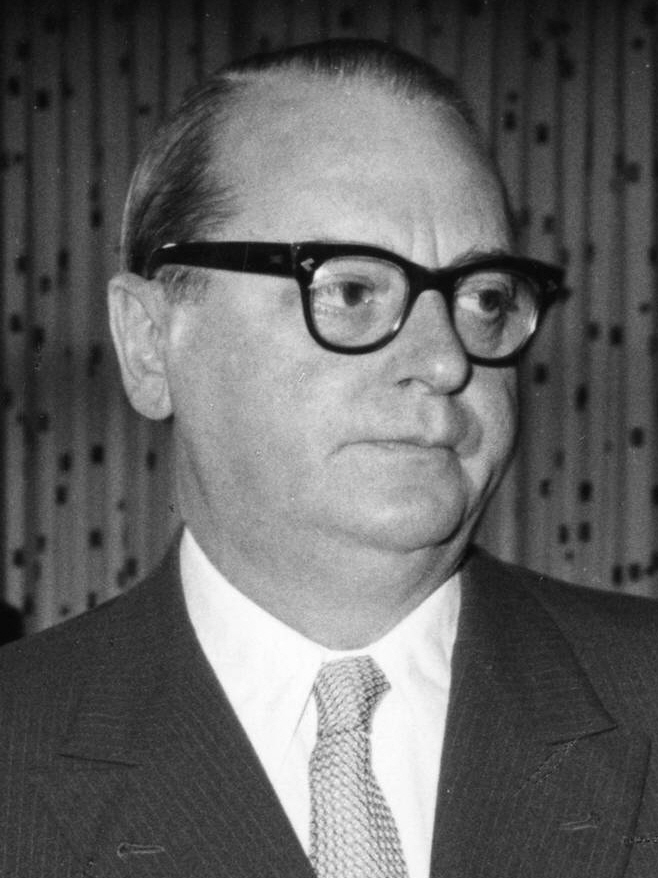
After Heinrich von Brentano was appointed Foreign Minister, Walter Hallstein retained his very influential status at the Foreign Office.

On 6 June 1955, Adenauer, who had until then been Foreign Minister as well as Chancellor, appointed Heinrich von Brentano foreign minister and there was a reshuffling of responsibilities, but Hallstein retained the trust of Adenauer and continued to attend cabinet meetings. Herbert Blankenhorn, who until then been the head of the Political Department of the Foreign Office, became the German Permanent Representative to NATO in Paris; Wilhelm Grewe took over the Political Department under Hallstein and was made Hallstein's deputy.

Hallstein was involved in discussions with the French concerning the return of the coal-rich Saar to Germany. In October 1955 there was a referendum held to decide whether the Saar would remain separate from Germany or be re-integrated into Germany, following which it was agreed with France that there would be political integration into the Federal Republic of Germany by 1 January 1957 and economic integration by 1 January 1960. In September 1956, Hallstein announced that France had agreed to hand over control of the Saar to Germany; on 27 October 1956, the Saar Treaty was signed.

==== Hallstein Doctrine ====
In 1955, Germany had in large measure regained its sovereignty and become integrated into western defence-organizations, the WEU and NATO; European integration had progressed, with the establishment of the ECSC; the Saar question was to be resolved by the referendum in October 1955. In all of these matters, Hallstein had played a major role. Some of the main issues of German foreign policy were now German re-unification and the relations of West Germany (the Federal Republic of Germany) with its eastern neighbours, including East Germany (the German Democratic Republic). Being more involved in Western European integration, Hallstein delegated much of this work to his deputy, Wilhelm Grewe. But in this area particularly, German foreign policy became associated with the name Hallstein. In 1955, Hallstein and Grewe accompanied Adenauer as members of a delegation to Moscow, where the establishment of diplomatic relations between Bonn and Moscow was agreed. It was on the flight back from Moscow that the policy that was later to become known as the Hallstein Doctrine was fleshed out, though the Foreign Office had already devised and practised elements of the policy. The idea behind the Hallstein Doctrine came from Hallstein's deputy, Wilhelm Grewe. The doctrine would become one of the major elements of West German foreign policy from September 1955 – until official recognition of the German Democratic Republic in October 1969.

Based on the Basic Law, its de facto constitution, the Federal Republic of Germany – then commonly known in the English-speaking world as West Germany – claimed an exclusive mandate to represent the whole of Germany, including the Communist East Germany, which was aligned with the Soviet Union. One of the early objectives of West German foreign policy was the diplomatic isolation of East Germany. In 1958, journalists named this policy the Hallstein–Grewe Doctrine, which later became shortened to the Hallstein Doctrine. Grewe himself writes that he did devise the broad outlines of the policy, but mainly as one of a number of options, the decisions being made by the foreign minister, Brentano, and the chancellor, Adenauer; in any case, the name Hallstein doctrine may have been something of a misnomer.

No official text of the so-called "doctrine" was made public, but it was explained publicly in a radio interview by its main architect, Wilhelm Grewe. Adenauer also explained the outlines of the policy in a statement to the German parliament on 22 September 1955. It meant that the Federal German government would regard it as an "unfriendly act" if third countries were to recognize or maintain diplomatic relations with the "German Democratic Republic" (East Germany). The exception was the Soviet Union, as one of the Four Powers responsible for Germany. The threatened response to such an unfriendly act was often understood to mean breaking off diplomatic relations; this was not stated as an automatic response under the policy, but remained the ultima ratio.

==== European integration and the Rome treaties ====
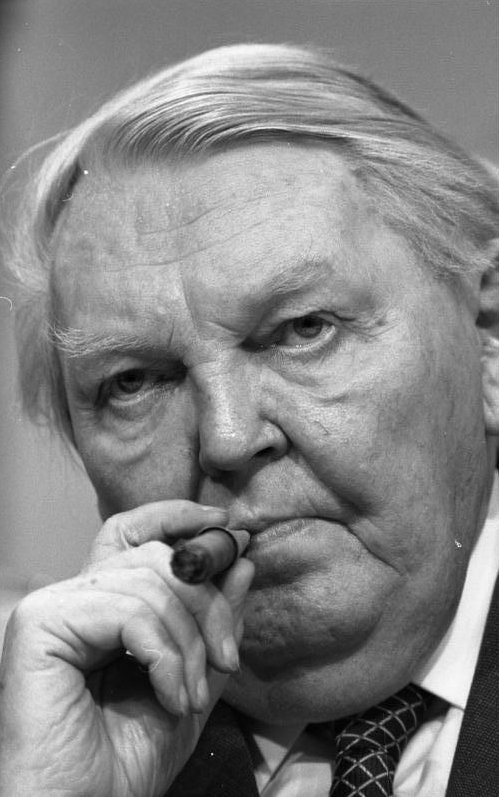
Economics minister Ludwig Erhard had opposing views on the path of European integration.

Members of the German government had different positions on European integration. Hallstein and his team at the Foreign Office advocated a federal solution with a form of "constitutional integration" broadly based on the European Coal and Steel Community, with the scope gradually increasing to include additional sectors, and with true parliamentary representation of the European populace. Hallstein contended that institutional integration was in the interests of a successful German export industry. Ludwig Erhard and the Ministry of Economics argued for a looser "functional integration" and advocated intergovernmental economic cooperation. Erhard opposed supranational structures and characterized the Foreign Office proponents of a federal Europe as out of touch with economic realities. In the dispute, Adenauer finally supported Hallstein, settling the acrimonious, and public, conflict between Hallstein and Erhard.

In 1955 the foreign ministers of the European Coal and Steel Community met at the Messina Conference, among other things to nominate a member of the High Authority of the European Coal and Steel Community and to appoint its new president and vice-presidents for the period ending 10 February 1957. The conference, which was held from 1 to 3 June 1955 in the Italian city of Messina, Sicily, would lead to the signing of the Treaty of Rome in 1957. Shortly before the conference, Adenauer had given up his double post as Foreign Minister and, since Brentano had not yet been sworn in, Hallstein led the German delegation. (Note: The delegations of the other countries were headed by Johan Willem Beyen (Netherlands), Gaetano Martino (Italy), Joseph Bech (Luxembourg), Antoine Pinay (France), and Paul-Henri Spaak (Belgium). Joseph Bech chaired the meeting.) The agenda included discussion of an action programme to relaunch European integration following the collapse, in August 1954, of the plans to create a European Political Community and a European Defence Community, when France failed to ratify the treaty.

On 6 September 1955, shortly before Adenauer's trip to Moscow, Hallstein, standing in for Brentano, attended the Noordwijk Conference of foreign ministers convened to evaluate progress made by the Spaak Committee. On 9 November 1955, Hallstein reported the results to the West German Cabinet, where the Ministry of Economics and the Ministry of Agriculture opposed the plans for a common market rather than a free trade area. The Ministry of Economics feared that a customs union meant protectionism; the Ministry of Agriculture was concerned that the interests of German farmers would be betrayed; Franz Josef Strauss opposed the perceived discrimination against German industry regarding access to uranium. Finally, the chancellor, Adenauer, again settled the dispute between the ministries by a decision in favour of Hallstein and the Foreign Office. When the Spaak Report (the Brussels Report on the General Common Market) was finally presented in April 1956, it recommended a customs union. In the Cabinet meeting of 9 May 1956, there was renewed opposition to the position of the Foreign Office from other ministers, but Adenauer lent his support to Hallstein, and the Cabinet authorized intergovernmental negotiations, to be held at the conference of foreign ministers in Venice at the end of May, the German delegation again to be led by Hallstein.

In July 1956, Britain made proposals for the Organisation for European Economic Co-operation (OEEC) to examine the possibility of a free trade area for industrial goods. The French, mainly interested in Euratom, attempted to separate the debate on the two topics and proposed a compromise treaty under which only the general principles of a common market would be agreed, leaving details to be decided later, but Germany made negotiations on Euratom dependent on negotiations on a common market. At the Venice Conference, the French foreign minister, Christian Pineau agreed to intergovernmental negotiations, with three provisos: the economic community was to be established in stages; customs tariffs should be reduced by only 30%; and national governments should not be overly constrained with regard to economic policy. Hallstein warned against accepting the French terms, which in his view meant that the French would push for a quick decision in favour of Euratom and delay the negotiations on the common market. Hallstein was supported by the foreign ministers of the Netherlands and Luxembourg, against France, in demanding a fixed deadline and timetable for the establishment of a common market. The French National Assembly approved the commencement of intergovernmental negotiations in July 1956, after the prime minister, Guy Mollet, gave an assurance that Euratom would not impose restrictions on the French nuclear weapons programme.

Another cause of disagreement was the inclusion of French overseas territories in any common market. Erhard strongly opposed this, partly because of the perceived danger of France involving the other member states in its colonial responsibilities. The Foreign Office shared these concerns to some extent but Hallstein and Carstens were willing to accept the French position, believing it would help gain support from the French National Assembly; Hallstein also accepted the argument of his French counterpart, Faure, that it would benefit Germany. Hallstein helped to strike a deal by which the imports and exports of overseas territories would be treated like products of the mother country and private investment and company branches of other member states would be permitted, thus opening up the overseas territories for German exports. Hallstein helped deal with these problems at two conferences of foreign ministers, one from 26 to 27 January 1957 and another on 4 February.

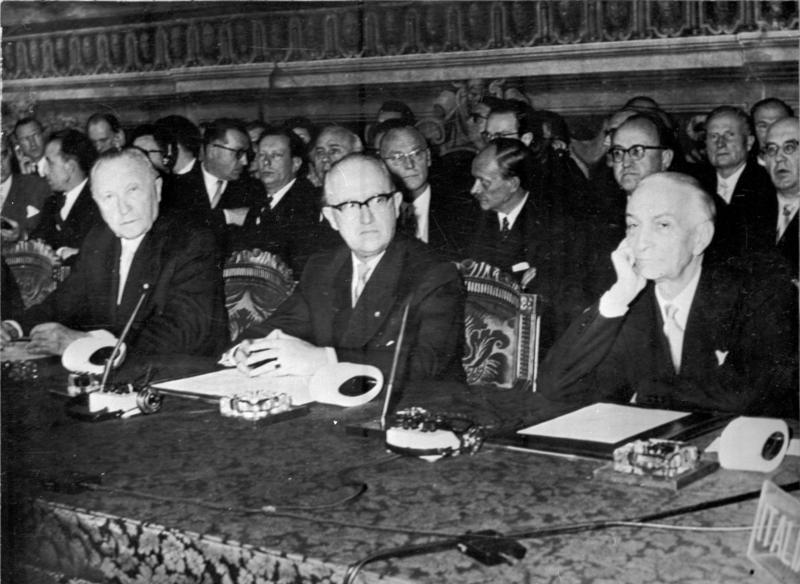
Konrad Adenauer, Walter Hallstein and Antonio Segni, signing the European Customs Union and Euratom in 1957 in Rome

On 25 March 1957, the six countries Belgium, France, Germany, Italy, Luxemburg, and the Netherlands signed the Treaties of Rome. Adenauer and Hallstein signed for Germany. The foreign minister, Brentano had largely left the negotiations to Hallstein, so the signing of the treaty represented a major success for Hallstein. It was also Hallstein who explained the treaties to the German parliament on 21 March 1957, before they were signed on 25 March 1957.

==== Choosing the President of the Commission ====
There had been previous suggestions of Hallstein becoming president of the European Court, but now he was put forward as the German candidate for the president of the Commission, though the Belgian Minister of Economics, Rey and the Netherlands Agriculture Minister, Mansholt were regarded as the strongest contenders for the position. The conference of foreign ministers on 20 December 1957 could not reach a decision, so when the Treaties of Rome took effect on 1 January 1958, the position had not been filled. At the conference of foreign ministers on 6 and 7 January 1958, however, Hallstein was finally chosen as the first president of the EEC Commission. Hallstein's selection for this position at the head of a major European organization, a decade after the end of World War II, was a major achievement for Germany.

== President of the Commission of the European Economic Community (1958–1967) ==
=== Laying the foundations of the EEC ===
Barely a decade after the end of World War II, the German Walter Hallstein was unanimously elected the first president of the Commission of the European Economic Community (now the European Commission) in Brussels. He was elected on 7 January 1958, and he was to remain in the position until 1967.

Hallstein's Commission, which held its first meeting on 16 January 1958, comprised nine members (two each from France, Italy and Germany, one each from Luxembourg, Belgium and the Netherlands). The tasks it faced included the implementation of a customs union and the Four Freedoms, as well as common policies on competition, trade, transport and agriculture.

Hallstein famously described his role as "a kind of European prime minister" and regarded national sovereignty as a "doctrine of yesteryear." Though Hallstein's personal vision of a federal Europe was clear, the EEC treaty left many questions open. Opinions were divided, for instance, on whether a common market could succeed without a common economic policy, on enlargement of the European Union – in particular, whether Britain should join – and whether the final goal should be a political union in the sense of a "United States of Europe".

Differing interests and traditions in the member states and differences of opinion among the politicians meant that consensus was difficult. The disagreements that had preceded the creation of the EEC continued after it was established, and these were reflected within the Commission. For instance, the protectionist Common Agricultural Policy (CAP), the responsibility of Sicco Mansholt, the Commissioner for Agriculture, was at odds with the liberal foreign trade policy of the Commissioner for External relations, Jean Rey.

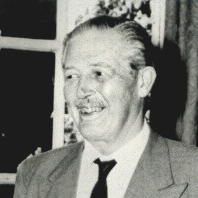
In 1961, the British government under Prime Minister Harold Macmillan applied to join the EEC.

Britain had at first been against the formation of the EEC, preferring a looser free trade area, and later proposed a larger free trade area that would include the EEC and other European countries. The German government, German industry, and – especially – the Economics Minister, Ludwig Erhard, wanted Britain to be part of an integrated Europe. Hallstein opposed the idea of a wider free trade area at this time, advocating first achieving a greater degree of integration among a smaller number of countries. Discussions on the possibility of a wider trade area, avoiding the tariff wall between the EEC and the EFTA countries, continued, but in the middle of preparations for the negotiations the French government, on instructions from de Gaulle, withdrew. This unilateral action by the French in November 1958 displeased the other EEC members and effectively ended the negotiations. German politicians like Erhard felt that Hallstein and his Commission had not done enough to promote the wider free trade area.

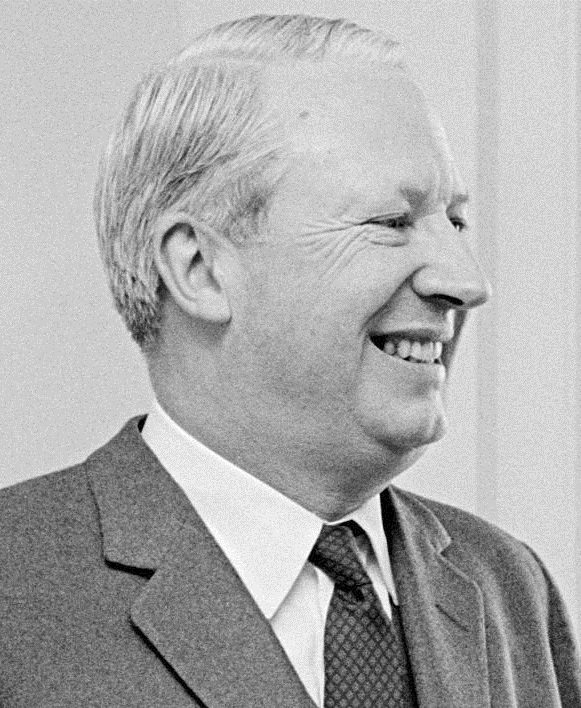
Edward Heath led Britain's application to join the EEC. He shared Hallstein's private nature and interest in music.

The six countries of the EEC had decided on a customs union: they agreed to remove tariffs between one another within a period of twelve years, and to erect a common tariff barrier between themselves and other countries. Seven of the excluded European countries (United Kingdom, Sweden, Denmark, Norway, Switzerland, Austria, and Portugal) responded with an alternative free trade area, EFTA, which also removed tariff barriers between each other, but did not insist on a tariff barrier with other countries. The EFTA convention was signed in January 1960 and was to come into force in May 1960. On 3 March 1960, Hallstein announced a plan for accelerating the implementation of the common market, which commentators regarded as sabotaging hopes of a joint free trade area that included the EEC and EFTA. This invoked the displeasure, not only of the EFTA countries, but also of the Economics Ministry under Erhard. Commentators talked of Hallstein's "religious zeal".

In 1961 Harold Macmillan, the British Prime Minister, finally gave up the idea of the larger free trade area, and the United Kingdom applied to join the EEC. Edward Heath, as Lord Privy Seal in the Macmillan government, led the negotiations in Britain's first attempt to join the EEC. Hallstein, as president of the EEC Commission, was cautious, considering the British application premature. Of British politicians, only Heath was able to establish a rapport with Hallstein. The Financial Times (of 2 August 1961) wrote that Hallstein was one of the least enthusiastic about British membership of the EEC. In British government circles he was at first seen as siding with the French and de Gaulle, against Britain and the other five members of the EEC, who were more welcoming to Britain, and as favouring the French protectionist position. Elements of the British Press, notably the Daily Express, were critical of Hallstein – or what he represented.

It was in 1961 that de Gaulle proposed the Fouchet Plan, a plan for an intergovernmental "union of states", as an alternative to the European Communities. There was little support from the other European countries, and negotiations were abandoned on 17 April 1962.

While Hallstein had a decidedly federal vision for Europe, and regarded the Commission as a quasi-federal organ, de Gaulle's vision was of a confederation. From the beginning, Hallstein did not believe that de Gaulle's approach of cooperation between sovereign nation states would be able to realize his vision of a powerful Europe that could play its proper part on the world stage.

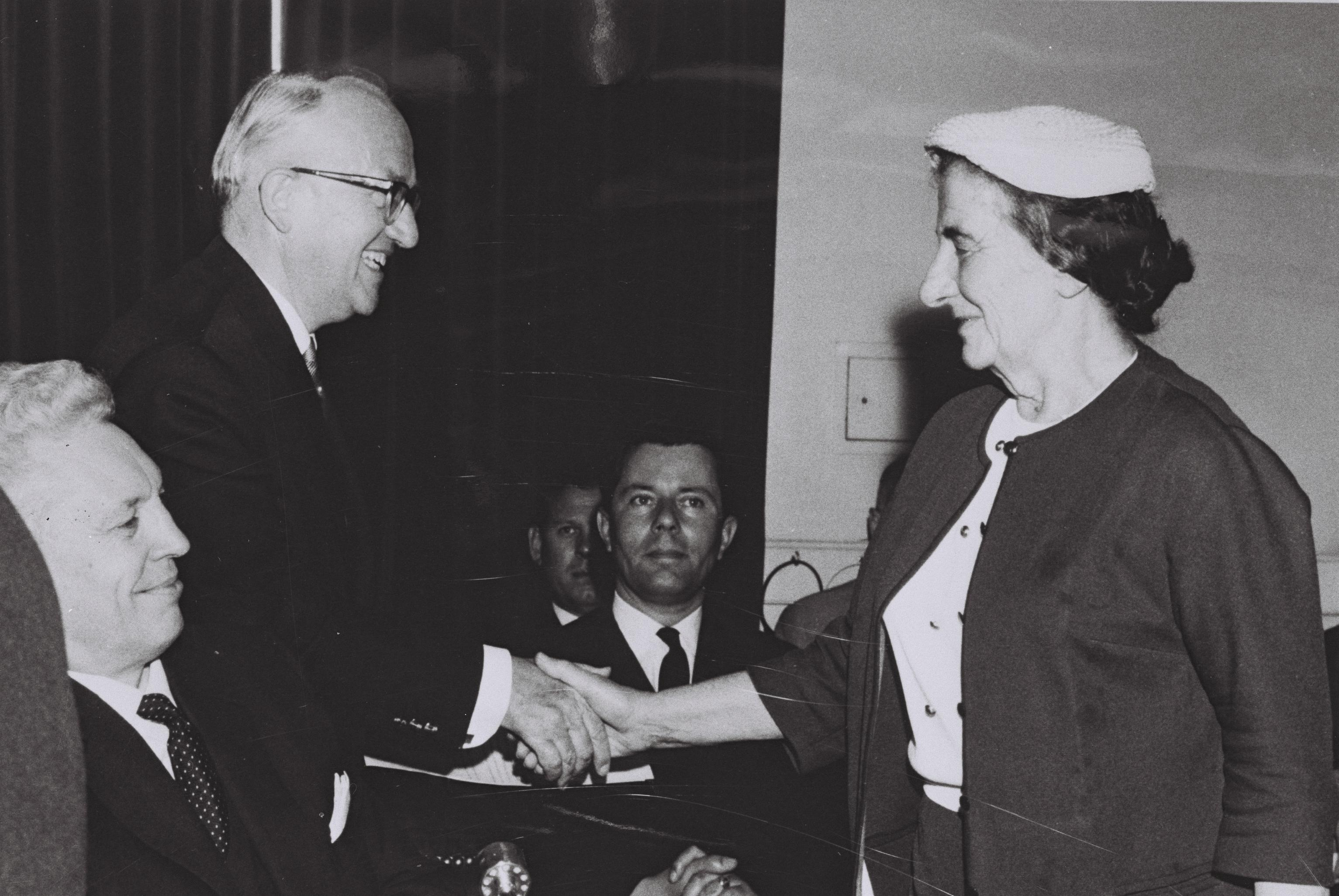
Hallstein with the then Minister of Foreign Affairs of Israel Golda Meir in 1964

De Gaulle also envisaged a pooling of sovereignty in certain areas, such as external defence, harmonization of industrial production and foreign trade, currency, exploitation of resources in overseas territories, and cultural and scientific development, but at the same time he was developing the French nuclear deterrent capability, the Force de Frappe, which he envisaged as part of a European defence capability independent of the United States. This independence from the United States was one of de Gaulle's main objectives; he was against the increased integration of Europe under the umbrella of transatlantic integration as provided for in the Rome treaties.

The Hallstein Commission drew up plans and a timetable for an economic and currency union, and Hallstein presented these to the Council of Ministers and the European Parliament in October 1962.

A second attempt by de Gaulle to establish a closer political union in Europe that would be independent of the United States was the Franco-German bilateral treaty on political cooperation. This treaty between France and Germany, which was signed on 22 January 1963, was criticized by other countries as being incompatible with the EEC and NATO treaties. Hallstein and other members of the Commission also criticized the treaty, and this angered de Gaulle. When the treaty was ratified by West Germany, the German Bundestag unilaterally added a preamble that re-affirmed the commitment to close transatlantic ties, the enlargement of the existing European Communities and attempts to secure Britain's accession. Since Britain had firmly expressed its unwillingness to support an autonomous European defence independent of America, de Gaulle regarded the treaty as a failure.

Further attempts by de Gaulle at military cooperation with Germany to the exclusion of America were rebuffed by Erhard (now Federal Chancellor) and his foreign minister Gerhard Schröder. Britain's application for membership of the EEC was vetoed by de Gaulle in 1963, which also further antagonized the other participants.

=== Confrontation with de Gaulle ===
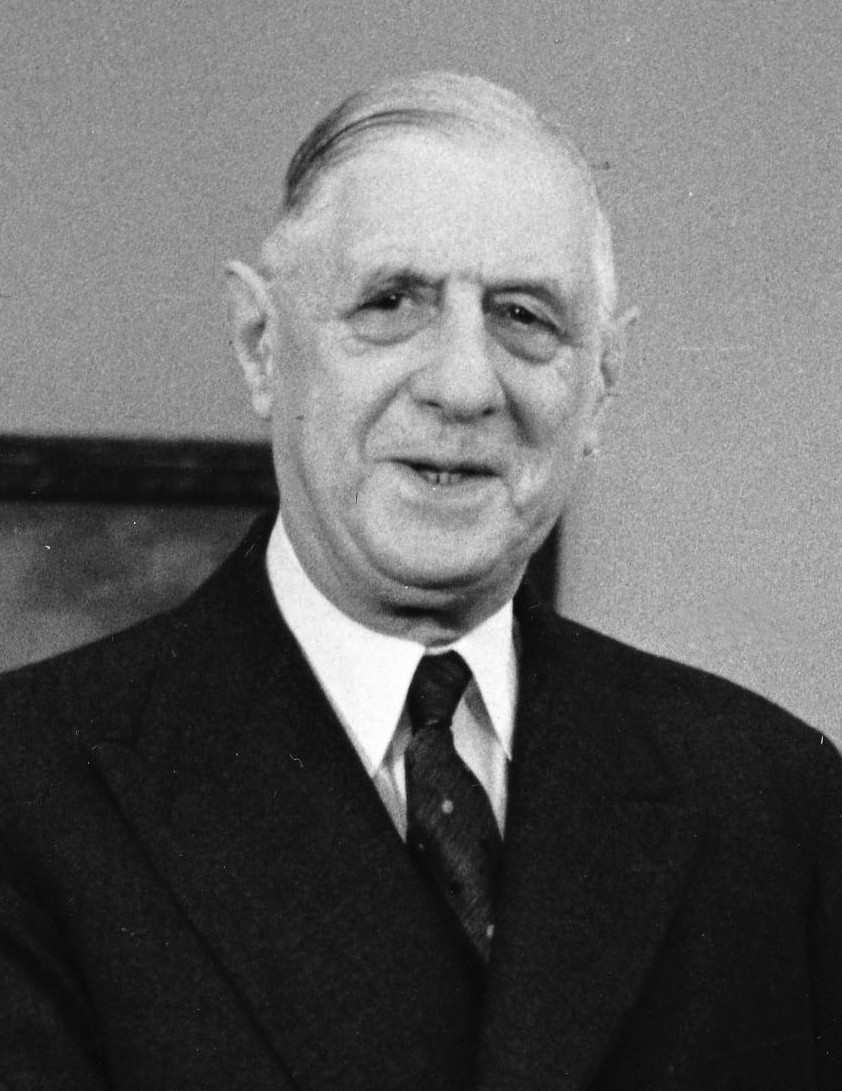
As President of the Commission of the EEC, Hallstein had a major confrontation with French president Charles de Gaulle that resulted in Hallstein's leaving the position.

De Gaulle took a confrontational course on the Common Agricultural Policy, and on 21 October 1964, the French Minister of Information, Alain Peyrefitte announced that France would leave the EEC if the European Agricultural market were not implemented in the agreed form by 15 December 1964. On 1 December 1964, Erhard, now head of government in Germany, announced that Germany would accede to French demands for a common wheat price, and on 15 December the Council of Ministers laid down common grain prices from 1 July 1967 and instructed the Commission to submit proposals for financing the Common Agricultural Policy (CAP) by 1 July 1965.

Differences between France and the Commission – and especially between de Gaulle and Hallstein – were exacerbated when France held the rotating six-month Presidency of the council, from January to June 1965.

The Council of Ministers instructed the Commission to submit plans by 1 April 1965 on how to finance the Common Agricultural Policy as from July 1965, including its financing from direct levies rather than national contributions; this would entail a transfer of revenues to the Community. The ministers representing other countries, in particular the Netherlands, indicated that their national parliaments would not approve the transfer of revenues to the Community unless the rights of the European Parliament were strengthened. On 20 January 1965, the European Parliament passed a resolution appealing to the governments to take this step toward strengthening a democratic and federal Europe. Hallstein supported this. Hallstein had received indications that other countries shared his point of view and decided to risk the confrontation with de Gaulle, interpreting the instructions from the Council broadly, with the support of Dutch Commissioner for Agriculture, Sicco Mansholt. The majority of the Commission backed Hallstein.

On 24 March 1965, Hallstein presented the Commission's proposals for financing the Common Agricultural Policy (CAP) to the European Parliament. It was proposed that customs duties collected at EEC borders would go to the community budget and that the Common Agricultural Market would be implemented as scheduled on 1 July 1967 – but the customs union for industrial products would also be implemented at the same time, two and a half years earlier than provided for in the Rome Treaty. The proposals would have allowed the Community to develop its own financial resources independently of the member states and given more budgetary powers to the European Parliament. From 1 January 1966, voting in the Council was to be by simple majority, removing the implicit veto power of individual countries. The French government stated it could not agree to this.

Since the legislation would increase not only the Commission's powers but also the Parliament's, Hallstein had the support of the Parliament, which had long been campaigning for more powers. Before the proposals were presented to the Council, they became public, and Hallstein then presented them to the European Parliament on 24 March, a week before presenting them to the council. When Hallstein put forward his proposals, the council was already concerned. France rejected the idea of the increased powers for the European Parliament and of the Community having its own independent revenues, insisting that what had been agreed by the Council regarding the financing of the common agricultural policy be implemented by 30 June 1965. He accused Hallstein of acting as if he were a head of state. France was particularly concerned about protecting the CAP because – under a majority system – it could be challenged by the other members.

After discussions between France and Germany, a compromise was at first reached, postponing implementation of the agricultural levies until 1970, but at the Council meeting of 28 June the Netherlands foreign minister, Joseph Luns, and his Italian counterpart, Amintore Fanfani, insisted that all of the Commission's proposals should be discussed as a package. German diplomats supported this position, and the German Bundestag passed a resolution stating that the Commission's proposals did not go far enough; Germany did not want to agree to the plans for agricultural financing without being assured that France would not hinder a general reduction in tariffs in the Kennedy Round.

The Committee of Permanent Representatives of the foreign ministers produced a report recommending a compromise by making both the agricultural levies and the customs duties available to be used for Community purposes but not centralizing the process; however, Hallstein refused to broker this deal and suggested employing the common practice of "stopping the clock" until the issue could be resolved.

Under pressure from Couve de Murville, who was the rotating President of the Council at the time, Hallstein agreed, on 30 June 1965, to work out a compromise. The same day, however, after consulting with de Gaulle, Couve de Murville announced that no agreement had been reached by the agreed deadline and that the negotiations had failed. France's presidency of the council, which rotated every six months, terminated on 30 June 1965.

==== Empty Chair Crisis ====
A few days later, on de Gaulle's instructions, France ceased participation in all meetings of the Council of Ministers and the Council of Permanent Representatives that dealt with any new decisions. Participation in many working groups ceased, and the French Permanent Representative to the EU, Jean-Marc Boegner was recalled, together with 18 high-ranking civil servants and diplomats.

In an attempt to resolve the situation, Hallstein, together with Marjolin, the (French) vice-president of the Commission, drew up a new plan, continuing the provisional arrangement for agricultural finances until 1 January 1970. This proposal was presented to the council on 22 June 1965.

De Gaulle, however, remained confrontational toward Hallstein and the Brussels "technocrats". In September 1965, he publicly declared his opposition to majority voting and the political role of the Commission. Since a treaty change required unanimity, there was a stalemate, and there was no provision in the treaties to cover such a boycott of the normal running of the Community. At least in Hallstein's eyes, it was a breach of treaty obligations, and he was unprepared for such a scenario.

On 20 October 1965 Couve de Murville, in the National Assembly, pushed for a revision of the treaties; this was opposed by the other five member states. At the Council meeting of 25 to 26 October, they passed a resolution stating that a solution "must be found within the provisions of the existing treaties". As a compromise, however, they offered the possibility of an extraordinary meeting of the council to discuss "the general situation of the Community" – without the Commission being invited.

Following the French presidential elections on 5 and 19 December 1965, de Gaulle accepted this offer. In the negotiations on 17/18 January 1966, the French foreign minister, Couve de Murville, dropped the more extreme of France's demands.

In January 1966, the six foreign ministers agreed to suggest to the Commission that the Permanent Representatives of the ministers should be consulted before making any major proposals and not to publish such proposals before they had been dealt with by the Council of Ministers. The other five took note of – but did not formally accept – the opinion of the French delegation that for matters of very important national interest, the discussion should continue until a unanimous agreement was reached.

This became known as the Luxembourg Compromise. It was not specified what could be invoked as a national interest and how to resolve disputes, so majority decisions were avoided and – until it was abolished by the Single European Act – it became a de facto veto, requiring unanimity for Council decisions. Some concessions were also made to French sensibilities; for instance, diplomats no longer presented their credentials to Hallstein alone but jointly to the presidents of the Commission and the council.

When the "Empty Chair Crisis" was finally resolved, it had lasted from 30 June 1965 to 29 January 1966.

When the French foreign minister Couve de Murville returned to the negotiating table after Hallstein's official term of office in January 1966, he insisted on Hallstein's departure and the nomination of someone else to be the head of the new Commission, which would in future be the Commission shared by all three communities when the EEC, the ECSC, and Euratom were merged.

Since there was no agreement on a replacement for Hallstein when his term ended on 8 January 1966, he remained in office as a caretaker (based on Article 159 of the EEC Treaty). This also meant that the planned merger of the three communities, which was to have taken place on 1 January 1966, was postponed.

In view of the confrontation with de Gaulle, there was a proposal that Hallstein should be nominated for a further term but that he should serve for only six months. The German Chancellor, Georg Kiesinger agreed to this compromise, but Hallstein considered this was a breach of the Treaty and on 5 May 1967 he asked not to be re-nominated at all.

In this way, the national governments had refused to accept the Commission becoming a European executive, blocking Hallstein's vision of a United States of Europe.

==== Issues behind confrontation with de Gaulle ====
De Gaulle recognized Hallstein's service to European integration but attributed it to German patriotism, serving the interests of Germany, enabling Germany to re-attain respect and status in Europe that it had lost because of Hitler. De Gaulle resented the status that Hallstein, for him a mere technocrat, was accorded by foreign states. Hallstein, for his part, was watchful that, as representative of the Commission, he was accorded the status normally accorded to a head of state. De Gaulle complained of the Commission usurping a political role reserved for governments and of Hallstein usurping a role reserved for heads of government or heads of state; he attacked Hallstein personally saying that Hallstein was trying to turn the EEC into a superstate, with Brussels as its capital; he talked of defending French democracy against an unaccountable and stateless technocracy, "a technocratic Areopagus, stateless and unaccountable" [De Gaulle at a press conference at the Élysée Palace on 9 September 1965. (Note: He said (in French) "Or on sait, Dieu sait si on le sait ! qu'il y a une conception différente au sujet d'une fédération européenne dans laquelle, suivant les rêves de ceux qui l'ont conçue, les pays perdraient leur personnalité nationale, et où, faute d'un fédérateur, tel qu'à l'Ouest tentèrent de l'être – chacun d'ailleurs à sa façon – César, et ses successeurs, Charlemagne, Orthon, Charles Quint, Napoléon, Hitler, et tel qu'à l'Est s'y essaya Staline, ils seraient régis par quelque aréopage technocratique, apatride, et irresponsable." (as quoted by Edward and Lane))]

In his memoirs, de Gaulle wrote of Hallstein

He was ardently wedded to the thesis of the super-State, and bent all his skilful efforts towards giving the Community the character and appearance of one. He had made Brussels, where he resided, into a sort of capital. There he sat, surrounded with all the trappings of sovereignty, directing his colleagues, allocating jobs among them, controlling several thousand officials who were appointed, promoted and remunerated at his discretion, receiving the credentials of foreign ambassadors, laying claim to high honours on the occasion of his official visits, concerned above all to further the amalgamation of the Six, believing that the pressure of events would bring about what he envisaged.

— De Gaulle, Memoirs of Hope

According to Der Spiegel, de Gaulle's complaints included

- Hallstein's being frequently received by US presidents, although the Commission had no foreign relations mandate;
- Hallstein's claim to be a sort of European prime minister;
- the rank of ambassador held by the representatives of the 65 states accredited with the European Commission;
- foreign ambassadors' presentation of their credentials to Hallstein (ambassadors normally present their credentials, signed by the country's head of state to the head of state of the host country);
- the participation of Commission staff in the Kennedy Round negotiations in Geneva, in negotiations with EFTA, and in negotiations with non-European states, in particular South American states.

On the political role of the Commission, Hallstein stated in an interview with Der Spiegel

In principle, we have no political competences ... because there is nothing of that nature in the Rome Treaty. But we have political responsibility because we are a political – not an economic – enterprise. The Common Market has the goal of unifying Europe politically. (Note: German: Im Prinzip haben wir keine (politischen) Kompetenzen ... weil davon nichts im Römischen Vertrag steht. Dennoch tragen wir eine politische Verantwortung, weil wir selbst ein politisches Unternehmen sind und kein wirtschaftliches. Der Gemeinsame Markt hat das Ziel, Europa politisch zu einigen.)

— Walter Hallstein, [Der Spiegel]

The issue that triggered the Empty Chair Crisis was the financing of the common agricultural policy, which was of critical interest to France: from 1962 to 1964, France had received 46 million US dollars from the agricultural fund, eighty-five per cent of all revenue.

The clash between Hallstein and de Gaulle demonstrated a clash between two opposing visions of Europe. The differences included:

- the debate on the inclusion of the United Kingdom
- the financing of the Common Agricultural Policy
- the rights of the European Parliament, especially with respect to the budget
- majority voting in the Council of Ministers.

On most of these issues, de Gaulle regarded Hallstein as an opponent. Hallstein's response to de Gaulle's attacks was also somewhat confrontational, comparing de Gaulle's actions with those of Hitler. (Note: Hallstein called de Gaulle's attempts to dismantle the progress achieved on the path to a supranational Europe "the greatest act of destruction in the history of Europe, even of the free world, since Hitler" (German: der größte Zerstörungsakt in der Geschichte Europas, ja der freien Welt, seit den Tagen Hitlers).)

== Later life (1967–1982) ==
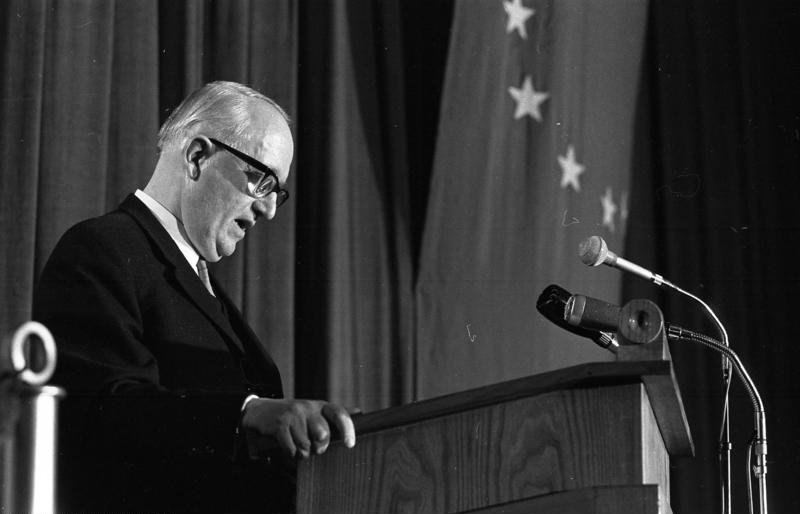
Hallstein in 1969, accepting the Robert Schuman Prize

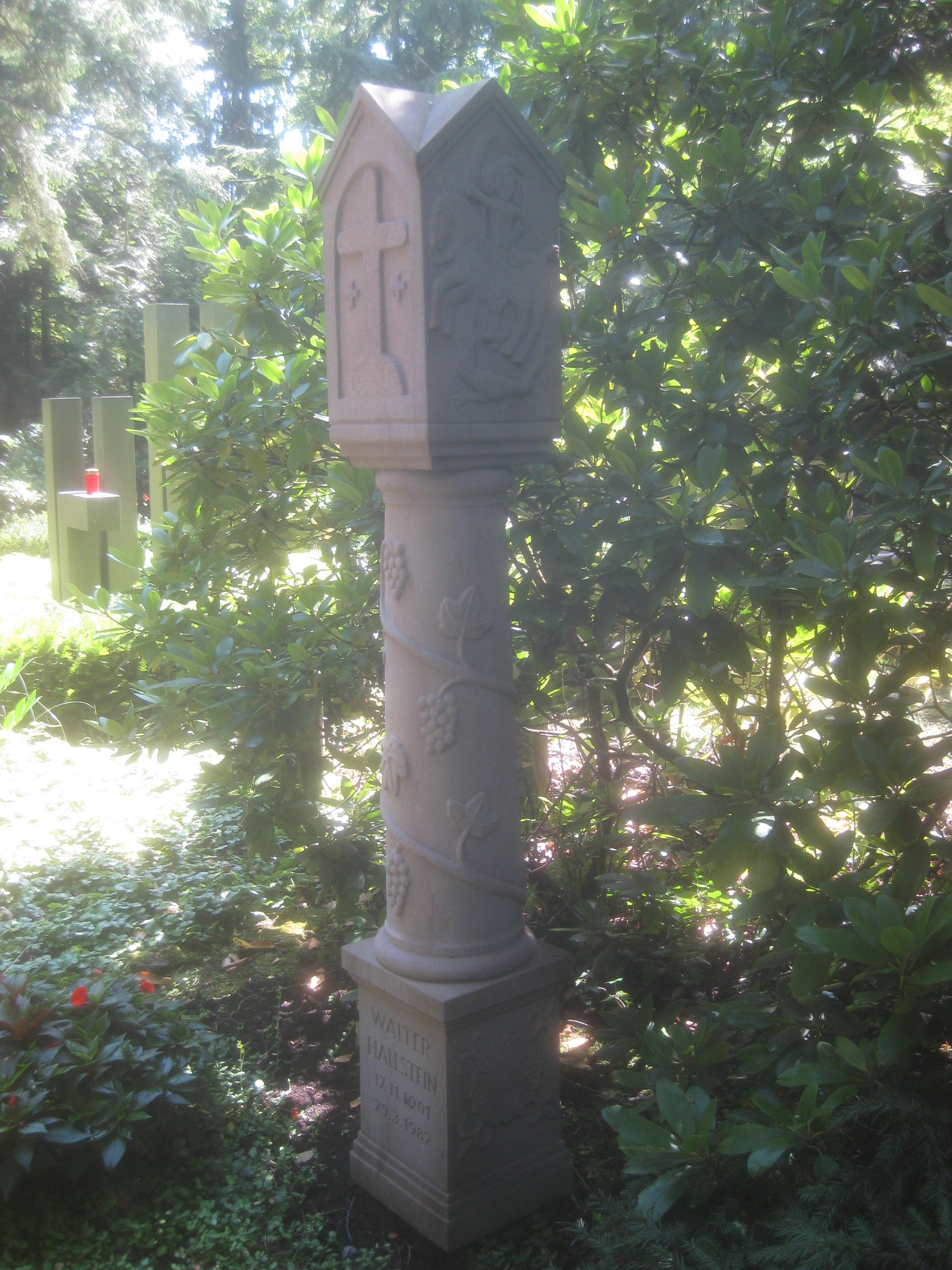
Grave of Walter Hallstein at the Waldfriedhof cemetery in Stuttgart

Hallstein left the Commission at the end of 1967, aged 68.

On 20 January 1968, Hallstein was elected president of the European Movement, a private organization founded in 1948 as the umbrella organization of various organizations in favour of European integration, where he continued to promote his vision of a "United States of Europe". Hallstein retained this office until 1974, when he did not stand for re-election, being followed by Jean Rey, who had also succeeded him as President of the Commission.

In the run-up to the federal elections in 1969, Helmut Kohl, then minister-president and head of the CDU in the state of Rhineland Palatinate offered Hallstein the opportunity of standing as a direct candidate in the Neuwied constituency in the Westerwald area and heading up the CDU party list in the state of Rhineland Palatinate. At the time, the CDU under Kurt Georg Kiesinger was the governing party. At the CDU "Euroforum 68" congress in Saarbrücken in January 1968, Hallstein was celebrated as the future foreign minister, should the CDU win the 1969 federal election. He proposed to confront de Gaulle and counter his attempts to "devalue" and "weaken" the European Community. However, the party lost the election, leaving Hallstein as a member of the Bundestag, but with no government office.

As reported by Der Spiegel, Hallstein was later approached by Kohl as a possible candidate to replace Heinrich Lübke as Federal President, but this did not come to fruition. From 1969 to 1972, he was a member of the German Federal Parliament for the Christian Democratic Union, where he was on the Foreign Affairs Committee and was one of the party's spokesmen for European affairs, along with Erik Blumenfeld and Carl-Ludwig Wagner. In the party, he supported the Junge Union, the CDU youth organization. Hallstein had little personal contact with his constituency, the work being done mainly by his assistant Christian Franck. At the next elections in 1972, he was not re-nominated. In his speeches in the Bundestag, he continued to express his vision of the European Union. He also spoke out in favour of direct election of the European Parliament in Germany. At that time, the members of the European Parliament were delegated by the Bundestag, and a direct election was not introduced until 1979.

Having left the Bundestag in 1972 and the presidency of the European Movement in 1974, Hallstein retired from active political life but continued to write and give talks. He moved from his country house in the Westerwald to Stuttgart and continued his work as an author.

Hallstein fell ill in early 1980 and died in Stuttgart on 29 March 1982, at the age of 80. He was buried, following a state funeral, on 2 April 1982 at the Waldfriedhof Cemetery in Stuttgart.

Hallstein remained a bachelor all his life.

== Vision of Europe ==
Central to Hallstein's ideas on Europe was his vision of a federal Europe. He called European integration a "revolutionary endeavour" that would take a long time. According to Hallstein's analysis of the situation, European integration was favoured by the external threat from the Soviet bloc and the internal threat of conflict between the states of central and western Europe and the political and economic fragility of some European democracies. Hallstein and his staff at the Foreign Office aimed for a constitutional framework in the federalist sense – a supranational concept that was opposed by the school centred around Ludwig Erhard and the Ministry of Economics, who advocated intergovernmental, economic cooperation, founded on free trade.

Hallstein spoke early in favour of the proposed European Defence Community, which never came to fruition, and of West German's integration in the West, which he saw as necessary for the solution of other problems, including German reunification.

In a speech in 1953, in London, Hallstein talked of three "dimensions" of European integration:

- Intensity expressed the degree to which member states give up individual sovereignty to create a supranational community.
- Extensity expressed the size of the community, that is the number of member states.
- Time expressed the order and speed of steps toward complete integration.

He spoke of a trade-off between the different dimensions, for instance: the larger the number of members, the less integration would be possible in a given time. His model included the coexistence of different European organizations of differing sizes and with differing degrees of integration. Such considerations were particularly relevant to the United Kingdom, which had been more in favour of intergovernmental organizations such as the Council of Europe and had shown less interest in supranational organizations like the European Coal and Steel Community and the proposed European Defence Community.

Though Hallstein first pursued the goal of economic integration, he stated that this was not an end in itself but was a means of achieving a political union that "pool[ed] all the appropriate functions of the member-states. For Hallstein the Schuman Plan was a way for Europe to become an equal partner of the United States – and as a way for Germany to "rejoin the organized community of free peoples". He envisaged a planned, gradual evolution involving a number of projects, coming together to produce a coherent whole. At first he talked of the "dynamic aspect of the constituent plans" (dynamischer Aspekt der Teilpläne), but later of what he – or rather his unenviable translator – called "material logic" (German: Sachlogik, an "anonymous force [that] only works through human will ... [an] inner logic, which is stronger than the capricious dictates of politics"). This meant setting up a situation in such a way that the desired goal would be achieved because people faced with future problems and choices would naturally choose the desired path – not automatically, but because the inherent logic of the situation would favour the desired choice. For instance, installing common tariffs would naturally lead to the need for a common trade policy; prescribing free movement for people, services, and capital would tend to lead to a common infrastructure, including a common tax policy, a common budgetary policy, and a common currency.

The Schuman Plan was the first step, applied to the field of economics; the next step was to be defence; these would then necessarily lead to integration in the related fields of industrial relations and social policy, energy policy and foreign policy.

Hallstein strove for a Europe based on the rule of law ("law in place of force"). His concept of European Union was that of a "community" based on democracy and the rule of law — not a federation (because it was not yet a state), nor a confederation ("because it was endowed with the power of exercising authority directly over every citizen in each of its member states").

A lawyer and an expert in international law, Hallstein saw a strong legal foundation as essential. His model of a federal Europe borrowed from the federal structures of Germany, the United States and Switzerland. Hallstein later wrote that the experience of Nazi Germany led him to distrust not only the idea of absolute and inalienable national sovereignty but also the British idea of a European balance of power. Partly as a result of the Americans' re-education programme, Hallstein developed an interest in the United States Constitution and American history between independence in 1776 and the ratification of the Constitution in 1788, when the United States was a confederation of states. The problems that the United States experienced were, in his view, due partly to the states defending their sovereignty. He rejected the concept of the unitary nation-state favoured by the French, in favour of a federal solution, and concluded that Europe should follow the American path towards a federal solution. However, he wished to retain Europe's diversity and opposed the idea of Europe becoming a "melting pot".

== Reception and legacy ==
People who knew Hallstein described him as someone with a keen intellect, an excellent command of language, and high reliability. But he was also perceived by those who knew him as cold, unapproachable, and excessively intellectual, respected rather than liked. British Prime Minister Edward Heath allegedly said of him "He is just a brain". He was also characterized as having a keen sense of duty: Franz Josef Strauss called him one of the last Prussians.

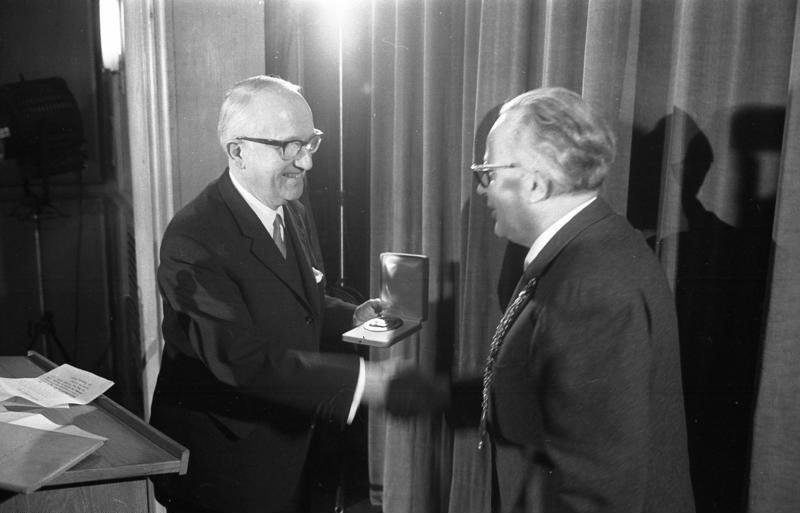
Accepting the Robert Schuman Prize in Bonn, February 1969

During his lifetime, Walter Hallstein received honorary doctorates from nine European universities, including the University of Padua, the University of Sussex, the University of Liège, Nancy-Université, Catholic University of Leuven, the University of Oviedo, and the University of Tübingen, and nine American universities, including Georgetown University, Harvard University, and Johns Hopkins University.

He was also awarded numerous other honours and prizes from European governments. (Note: Honours awarded to Hallstein included the following: 1953: Knight Grand Cross of the Order of Merit of the Italian Republic; 1953/54: Grand Cross (Grand Merit Cross with Star and Sash) of the Order of Merit of the Federal Republic of Germany; 1955: Grand Decoration of Honour in Gold with Sash for Services to the Republic of Austria; 1955: Icelandic Grand Cross of the Order of the Falcon; 1961 Charlemagne prize (Karlspreis) from the City of Aachen for efforts in the cause of European federation; 1964: Honorary member of the American Society of International Law; 1968: Order of Merit of the Equestrian Order of the Holy Sepulchre of Jerusalem; 1968: Grand Cordon of the Order of Leopold; 1968: Knight Grand Cross of the Order of the Netherlands Lion; 1969: Robert Schuman Prize; 1969: Grand Cross of the Pontifical Equestrian Order of St. Sylvester Pope and Martyr (GCSS); 1969: Grand Cross of the Brazilian Order of the Southern Cross; 1969: Grand Cross of the Greek Order of George I; 1969: Grand Cross of the Argentinian order of merit; 1971: Honorary citizen of Brussels, the first German since the War to receive such an honour)

In 1997, the Walter Hallstein Institute for European Constitutional Law at the Humboldt University of Berlin was named in his honour.

== Works ==
The documented total number of publications by Hallstein exceeds 365.

Hallstein's major popular work was Der unvollendete Bundesstaat [The Unfinished Federation], which was first published in 1969:

- Hallstein, Walter (1969). Der unvollendete Bundesstaat. Europäische Erfahrungen und Erkenntnisse. Düsseldorf, Vienna: Econ. ISBN 978-3-430-13897-0.

This book can be seen as Hallstein's political testament. The second German edition was titled simply Die Europäische Gemeinschaft [The European Community]:

- Hallstein, Walter (1973). Die europäische Gemeinschaft. Düsseldorf, Vienna: Econ. ISBN 978-3-430-13898-7.

A later version was published in English with the title Europe in the Making:

- Hallstein, Walter (1972). Europe in the Making. Translated by Charles Roetter. George Allen & Unwin. ISBN 978-0-04-330215-6.

He also wrote a number of academic books and numerous articles, and he gave innumerable speeches. Some of his speeches were published as a book:

- Hallstein, Walter (1979). Europäische Reden. Stuttgart: Deutsche Verlags-Anstalt. ISBN 978-3-421-01894-6.

== Bibliography ==
- Adenauer, Konrad (22 September 1955). "Government statement made by Federal Chancellor Konrad Adenauer to the German Parliament (Bundestag) on 22 September 1955" (PDF) (in German). Konrad Adenauer Stiftung. Archived from the original (PDF) on 23 May 2013.
- American Society of International Law (1964). "Proceedings of the American Society of International Law at its Fifty-Eighth Annual Meeting". 58.
- Austrian Chancellor. "Reply to a parliamentary question" (PDF) (in German). p. 19.
- Bärenbrinker, Frank (1998). "Hallstein's Conception of Europe Before Assuming Office in the Commission". In Loth, Wilfried; Wallace, William; Wessels, Wolfgang (eds.). Walter Hallstein: The Forgotten European?. Forewords by Jacques Delors, Sir Edward Heath, and Helmut Kohl; translated from the German by Bryan Ruppert. York: St. Martin's Press. pp. 82–91. ISBN 978-0-312-21293-3.
- Bitsch, Marie-Thérèse (2007). The European Commission, 1958–72: history and memories. Office for Official Publications of the European Communities.
- Buddrus, Michael; Fritzlar, Sigrid (2007). Die Professoren der Universität Rostock Im Dritten Reich: Ein Biographisches Lexikon [The Professors of the University of Rostock in the Third Reich: A Biographical Lexicon]. Texte und Materialien zur Zeitgeschichte [Text and Materials on Contemporary History] (in German). Vol. 16. Walter de Gruyter. pp. 173–176. doi:10.1515/9783110957303. ISBN 978-3-11-095730-3.
- Conze, Eckart; Frei, Norbert; Hayes, Peter; Zimmermann, Moshe (2010). Das Amt und die Vergangenheit. Deutsche Diplomaten im Dritten Reich und in der Bundesrepublik [The Foreign Office and the Past: German Diplomats in the Third Reich and in the Federal Republic of Germany] (in German). Munich: Blessing. ISBN 978-3-89667-430-2.
- CVCE. "The 'Empty Chair' Policy". Centre Virtuel de la Connaissance sur l'Europe [Virtual Centre for Knowledge about Europe].
- ——. "The Luxembourg Compromise". Centre Virtuel de la Connaissance sur l'Europe [Virtual Centre for Knowledge about Europe].
- De Gaulle, Charles (1971) [First published in France in 1970 under the title Mémoires d'Espoir]. Memoirs of Hope. Translated by Terence Kilmartin. Weidenfeld and Nicolson. ISBN 978-0-297-00346-5.
- Dettke, Thomas (1981). "Pionier der Europäischen Integration: Robert Schuman" [Pionier of European Integration: Robert Schuman]. In Jansen, Dieter; Mahncke, Dieter (eds.). Persönlichkeiten der Europäischen Integration: vierzehn biographische Essays [Personalities of European Integration: Fourteen Biographical Essays] (in German). Bonn: Europa Union. ISBN 978-3-7713-0146-0.
- Dumoulin, Michel (2007). The European Commission, 1958–72: history and memories. Luxembourg: Office for Official Publications of the European Communities. ISBN 978-92-79-05494-5.
- Eden, Anthony, Secretary of State for Foreign Affairs (10 June 1952). "Germany: Contractual Agreements and EDC". Parliamentary Debates (Hansard). House of Commons. col. 32–41.
- Edward, David A. O.; Lane, Robert (2013). Edward and Lane on European Union Law. Elgar. ISBN 978-0-8579-3105-4.
- Elvert, Jürgen (2011). "Walter Hallstein, Biography of a European (1901–1982)". Centre Virtuel de la Connaissance sur l'Europe.
- Freiberger, Thomas (2010). "Der friedliche Revolutionär: Walter Hallsteins Epochenbewusstsein" [The Peaceful Revolutionary: Walter Hallstein's Sense of Epoch]. In Depkat, Volker; Graglia, Piero S. (eds.). Entscheidung für Europa: Erfahrung, Zeitgeist und politische Herausforderungen am Beginn der europäischen Integration [Decision for Europe: Experience, Zeitgeist, and Political Challenges at the Beginning of European Integration] (in German). de Gruyter. pp. 205–242. ISBN 978-3-11-023389-6.
- Geary, Michael J. (2013). Enlarging the European Union: The Commission Seeking Influence, 1961–1973. Palgrave Macmillan. ISBN 978-1-137-24523-6.
- German Foreign Office. "Römische Verträge" [Treaties of Rome] (in German). German Foreign Office.
- German Historical Museum. "Walter Hallstein" (in German). German Historical Museum.
- Gerstenmaier, Eugen (1981). Streit und Friede hat seine Zeit: Ein Lebenbericht [Conflict and Peace Each Have Their Time: A Life] (in German). Propyläen. ISBN 978-3-549-07621-7.
- Götz, Hans Herbert (1998). "The Crisis of 1965–66". In Loth, Wilfried; Wallace, William; Wessels, Wolfgang (eds.). Walter Hallstein: The Forgotten European?. Forewords by Jacques Delors, Sir Edward Heath, and Helmut Kohl; translated from the German by Bryan Ruppert. New York: St. Martin's Press. pp. 151–162. ISBN 978-0-312-21293-3.
- Gray, William Glenn (2003). Germany's Cold War: The Global Campaign to Isolate East Germany. University of North Carolina Press. ISBN 978-0-8078-6248-3.
- Grewe, Wilhelm (1979). Rückblenden 1976-1951 [Retrospections] (in German). Frankfurt/Main: Propyläen. ISBN 978-3-549-07387-2.
- —— (1998). "Hallstein's Conception of German-German Policy and Relations". In Loth, Wilfried; Wallace, William; Wessels, Wolfgang (eds.). Walter Hallstein: The Forgotten European?. Forewords by Jacques Delors, Sir Edward Heath, and Helmut Kohl; translated from the German by Bryan Ruppert. New York: St. Martin's Press. pp. 39–59. ISBN 978-0-312-21293-3.
- Griffiths, Richard T. (1994). "Europe's First Constitution: The European Political Community, 1952–1954". In Martin, Stephen (ed.). The Construction of Europe: Essays in Honour of Emile Noël. with the cooperation of Émile Noël. Kluwer Acad. Publ. pp. 19–40. ISBN 978-0-7923-2969-5.
- Groeben, Hans von der (1998). "Walter Hallstein as President of the Commission". In Loth, Wilfried; Wallace, William; Wessels, Wolfgang (eds.). Walter Hallstein: The Forgotten European?. Forewords by Jacques Delors, Sir Edward Heath, and Helmut Kohl; translated from the German by Bryan Ruppert. New York: St. Martin's Press. pp. 95–108. ISBN 978-0-312-21293-3.
- Hallstein, Walter (28 April 1951). Address given by Walter Hallstein on the Schuman Plan in German (Speech). Translated into English by the Centre Virtuel de la Connaissance sur l'Europe (CVCE). Wolfgang Goethe University in Frankfurt, West Germany.
- —— (16 January 1958). Walter Hallstein's inaugural address to the constituent meeting of the Commission of the European Economic Community on 16 January 1958 (PDF) (Speech). Translated into English by the Centre Virtuel de la Connaissance sur l'Europe (CVCE). Brussels.
- —— (1972). Europe in the Making. Translated by Charles Roetter. George Allen & Unwin. ISBN 978-0-04-330215-6.
- Heiber, Helmut (1991). Universität unterm Hakenkreuz Teil 1. Der Professor im Dritten Reich : Bilder aus der akademischen Provinz [University under the Swastika, Part 1. Professor under the Third Reich: Pictures of the academic province] (in German). K. G. Saur. p. 360. ISBN 3-598-22629-2.
- Icelandic Presidency. "Fálkaorðuhafar: Hallstein, Walter" [Cross holders: Hallstein, Walter]. Archived from the original on 5 June 2013.
- Jansen, Thomas (1998). "Walter Hallstein: After the Presidency". In Loth, Wilfried; Wallace, William; Wessels, Wolfgang (eds.). Walter Hallstein: The Forgotten European?. Forewords by Jacques Delors, Sir Edward Heath, and Helmut Kohl; translated from the German by Bryan Ruppert. New York: St. Martin's Press. pp. 165–180. ISBN 978-0-312-21293-3.
- Kilian, Michael (2005). "Walter Hallstein: Jurist und Europäer" [Walter Hallstein: Jurist and European]. Jahrbuch des öffentlichen Rechts der Gegenwart. New series (in German). 53. Tübingen: Mohr Siebeck: 369–389. ISSN 0075-2517.
- Kilian, Werner (2001). Die Hallstein-Doktrin. Der diplomatische Krieg zwischen der BRD und der DDR 1955–1973. Aus den Akten der beiden deutschen Außenministerien [The Hallstein Doctrine: The Diplomatic War between the Federal Republic of Germany and the German Democratic Republic 1955–1973. From the files of the two German foreign ministries]. Zeitgeschichtliche Forschungen (in German). Vol. 7. Berlin: Duncker & Humblot. ISBN 978-3-428-10371-3. ISSN 1438-2326.
- Kitchen, Martin (8 April 2011). A History of Modern Germany: 1800 to the Present. Quellen u. Darstellungen zur Zeitgeschichte [Sources and Presentations on Contemporary History] (2nd ed.). John Wiley & Sons. ISBN 978-0-470-65581-8.
- Knoll, Thomas (2004). Das Bonner Bundeskanzleramt: Organisation und Funktionen 1949 – 1999 [The Federal Chancellery in Bonn: Organisation and Functions1949 – 1999] (in German). Wiesbaden: VS Verlag für Sozialwissenschaften. ISBN 978-3-531-14179-4.
- Küsters, Hanns Jürgen (1998). "Walter Hallstein and the Negotiations on the Treaties of Rome 1955–57". In Loth, Wilfried; Wallace, William; Wessels, Wolfgang (eds.). Walter Hallstein: The Forgotten European?. Forewords by Jacques Delors, Sir Edward Heath, and Helmut Kohl; translated from the German by Bryan Ruppert. New York: St. Martin's Press. pp. 60–81. ISBN 978-0-312-21293-3.
- —— (2011). "110. Geburtstag von Walter Hallstein" [The 110th anniversary of Walter Hallstein's birth] (in German).
- Lahn, Lothar (1998). "Walter Hallstein as State Secretary". In Loth, Wilfried; Wallace, William; Wessels, Wolfgang (eds.). Walter Hallstein: The Forgotten European?. Forewords by Jacques Delors, Sir Edward Heath, and Helmut Kohl; translated from the German by Bryan Ruppert. New York: St. Martin's Press. pp. 17–32. ISBN 978-0-312-21293-3.
- Loch, Theo (1968). "Einleitung und biographische Skizze" [Introduction and a Biographical Sketch]. Europa 1980 (in German). Bonn: Eicholz.
- Loth, Wilfried (1998). "Hallstein und de Gaulle: the Disastrous Confrontation". In Loth, Wilfried; Wallace, William; Wessels, Wolfgang (eds.). Walter Hallstein: The Forgotten European?. Forewords by Jacques Delors, Sir Edward Heath, and Helmut Kohl; translated from the German by Bryan Ruppert. New York: St. Martin's Press. pp. 135–150. ISBN 978-0-312-21293-3.
- Ludlow, N (2006). "De-Commissioning the Empty Chair Crisis : the Community Institutions and the Crisis of 1965–6". London School of Economics. Archived from the original on 25 October 2007.
- Maulucci, Thomas W. Jr. (2012). Adenauer's Foreign Office: West German Diplomacy in the Shadow of the Third Reich. Northern Illinois University Press. ISBN 978-1-60909-077-7.
- McCauley, Martin (2008) [1998]. Russia, America and the Cold War, 1949–1991. Seminar Studies in History. Berlin: Pearson Education. ISBN 978-1-4058-7430-4.
- Narjes, Karl-Heinz (1998). "Walter Hallstein and the Early Phase of the EEC". In Loth, Wilfried; Wallace, William; Wessels, Wolfgang (eds.). Walter Hallstein: The Forgotten European?. Forewords by Jacques Delors, Sir Edward Heath, and Helmut Kohl; translated from the German by Bryan Ruppert. New York: St. Martin's Press. pp. 109–130. ISBN 978-0-312-21293-3.
- Piela, Ingrid (2010). "Walter Hallstein (1901–1982) Leben und Wirken eines Europäers der ersten Stunde" [Walter Hallstein (1901–1982) Life and Work of a European of the First Hour] (PDF). IEV Online. IEV-Online, Hagener Online-Beiträge zu den Europäischen Verfassungswissenschaften (in German). 1/2010. Institut für Europäische Verfassungswissenschaften, FernUniversität in Hagen. ISSN 1868-6680. Archived from the original (PDF) on 30 January 2012.
- —— (2012). Walter Hallstein – Jurist und gestaltender Europapolitiker der ersten Stunde: Politische und institutionelle Visionen des ersten Präsidenten der EWG-Kommission (1958–1967) [Walter Hallstein – Lawyer and Formative European Politician of the First Hour: Political and Institutional Visions of the First President of the EEC Commission (1958–1967)]. Veröffentlichungen des Dimitris-Tsatsos-Instituts für Europ. Verfassungswissenschaften (in German). Vol. 11. Berliner Wissenschaftsverlag. ISBN 978-3-8305-3139-5.
- Raehlmann, Irene (2012). Arbeitswissenschaft im Nationalsozialismus: Eine wissenschaftssoziologische Analyse [Labour Studies under National Socialism: A Sociological Analysis]. Springer. ISBN 978-332280765-6.
- Rostock University. "Hallstein, Walter". Catalogus Professorum Rostochiensium (in German).
- Soetendorp, Ben (2014). Foreign Policy in the European Union: History, theory & practice. Routledge. ISBN 9781317881216.
- Schönwald, Matthias (2017). Walter Hallstein: Ein Wegbereiter Europas [Walter Hallstein: a pioneer of Europe]. Kohlhammer Verlag. ISBN 978-3-17-033164-8.
- Schönwald, Matthias: Walter Hallstein. Aspekte seiner politischen Biographie. In: Christoph E. Palmer (Ed.): Die politischen Kräfte in unserem Werk drängen weiter. Gedenkveranstaltung für Walter Hallstein am 17. November 2001 in Stuttgart. Staatsministerium Baden-Württemberg, Stuttgart 2002, p. 13–30.
- Schönwald, Matthias: Walter Hallstein et les institutions des Communautés Européennes. In: Marie-Thérèse Bitsch (Ed.): Le couple France-Allemagne et les institutions européennes. Une postérité pour le plan Schuman? Bruylant, Bruxelles 2001, p. 151–168.
- Schönwald, Matthias: Walter Hallstein and the "Empty chair" Crisis 1965/66. In: Wilfried Loth (Ed.): Crises and compromises. Nomos, Baden-Baden 2001, ISBN 3-7890-6980-9, p. 157–172.
- Schönwald, Matthias: "The same – should I say – antenna". Gemeinsamkeiten und Unterschiede im europapolitischen Denken von Jean Monnet und Walter Hallstein (1958–1963). In: Andreas Wilkens (Ed.): Interessen verbinden. Jean Monnet und die europäische Integration der Bundesrepublik Deutschland Bouvier, Bonn 1999, p. 269–298.
- Sloan, S.R. (2005). NATO, the European Union, and the Atlantic community: the transatlantic bargain reconsidered. Rowman & Littlefield. ISBN 978-0-7425-3573-2.
- Spiegel Online (6 April 1960). "EWG-Beschleunigung : Hallsteins Eiserner Vorhang" [EEC Acceleration: Hallstein's Iron Curtain]. Spiegel Online (in German).
- —— (14 July 1965). "EWG: Krieg und Frieden" [EEC: War and Peace]. Spiegel Online (in German).
- —— (4 August 1965). "Hallstein: Vermintes Gelände Gemeinsamer Markt" [Hallstein: Common Market Minefield]. Spiegel Online (in German).
- —— (17 January 1966). "EWG-KRISE" [EEC Crisis]. Spiegel Online (in German).
- —— (13 June 1966). "Hallstein: So oder so: EWG" [Hallstein: Whatever: EEC]. Spiegel Online (in German).
- —— (24 April 1967). "EWG / Hallstein: Verdiente Leute" [EEC / Hallstein: People of Merit]. Spiegel Online (in German).
- —— (29 January 1968). "Hallstein: Marsch auf Bonn" [Hallstein: Marching on Bonn]. Spiegel Online (in German).
- —— (24 June 1968). "Bonn / Lübke-Nachfolge: Rechte Eigenschaften" [Bonn / Lübke's successor: The Right Qualities]. Spiegel Online (in German).
- Urwin, Derek (1995). The Community of Europe: A History of European Integration Since 1945. Longman. ISBN 9780582231993.
- van Middelaar, Luuk (2013). The Passage to Europe: How a Continent Became a Union. Translated by Liz Waters. Yale University Press. ISBN 978-0-30018112-8.
- Wallace, William (1998). "Walter Hallstein: the British Perspective". In Loth, Wilfried; Wallace, William; Wessels, Wolfgang (eds.). Walter Hallstein: The Forgotten European?. Forewords by Jacques Delors, Sir Edward Heath, and Helmut Kohl; translated from the German by Bryan Ruppert. New York: St. Martin's Press. pp. 181–199. ISBN 978-0-312-21293-3.
- Wendt, Hans (1995). "Interview des Ministerialdirektors, Professor Dr. Wilhelm G. Grewe mit dem Chefredakteur des Nordwestdeutschen Rundfunk, Hans Wendt ("Hallstein-Doktrin"), 11. Dezember 1955" [Interview with Professor Wilhelm Grewe, Head of the Political Department. of the Foreign Office of the Federal Republic of Germany, on 11 December 1955: Summary]. 100(0) Schlüsseldokumente zur deutschen Geschichte im 20. Jahrhundert [100(0) key documents on German history of the 20th century] (in German). Bavarian State Library. Archived from the original on 2 January 2020.

Political offices
New office	German European Commissioner; 1958–1967; Served alongside: Hans von der Groeben	Succeeded by Fritz Hellwig
New office	German European Commissioner; 1958–1967; Served alongside: Hans von der Groeben	Succeeded by Hans von der Groeben
New office	President of the European Commission; 1958–1967	Succeeded by Jean Rey
