= Bundesrepublik =

Bundesrepublik is German for federal republic. It may also refer to:

- The present nation of Germany
- The past nation of West Germany

== See also ==
- BRD (Germany)
