= Robert Schuman Foundation =

Robert Schuman Foundation may refer to these organizations named after Robert Schuman, former French prime minister and a founding father of the European Union:

- Robert Schuman Foundation (European People's Party)
- Robert Schuman Foundation (France), established 1991

== See also ==
- Robert Schuman Medal (disambiguation)
