= Hallstein Doctrine =

1955–1970 one-Germany policy during the Cold War

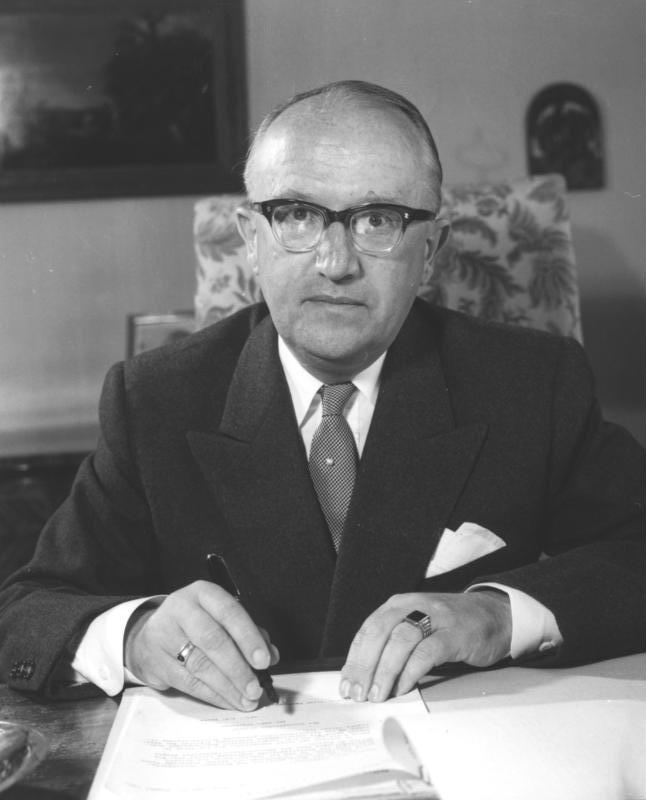
Walter Hallstein

The Hallstein Doctrine (German: Hallstein-Doktrin), named after Walter Hallstein, was a key principle in the foreign policy of the Federal Republic of Germany (West Germany) from 1955 to 1970. As usually presented, it prescribed that the Federal Republic would not establish or maintain diplomatic relations with any state that recognized the German Democratic Republic (East Germany). In fact it was more nuanced. There was no public official text of the "doctrine", but its main architect, Wilhelm Grewe, explained it publicly in a radio interview. Konrad Adenauer, who served as Chancellor of West Germany from 1949 to 1963, explained the outlines of the policy in a statement to the West German parliament on 22 September 1955. It meant that the Federal German government would regard it as an unfriendly act (acte peu amical) if third countries were to recognize the "German Democratic Republic" (East Germany) or to maintain diplomatic relations with it – with the exception of the Soviet Union (as one of the Four Powers responsible for Germany). The West German response to such could mean breaking off diplomatic relations, though this was not stated as an automatic response under the policy and in fact remained the ultima ratio (last resort).

The Federal Republic abandoned important aspects of the doctrine after 1970 when it became difficult to maintain, and the Federal government changed its politics towards the German Democratic Republic. The Four Power Agreement on Berlin in 1971 and the signing of the Basic Treaty in 1972 brought an end to the doctrine, in accordance with the new strategy of Ostpolitik.

== Historical background ==
=== Partition of Germany ===
Following Germany's defeat in World War II, the territory east of the Oder–Neisse line was under Soviet or Polish administration and had de facto been annexed. The rest of the territory west of that was divided into four occupation zones controlled by the Allies, with the former capital, Berlin, being similarly divided into four sectors.

The western zones controlled by France, the United Kingdom, and the United States were merged, in May 1949, to form the Federal Republic of Germany (Bundesrepublik Deutschland); in October 1949, the Soviet Zone became the German Democratic Republic (Deutsche Demokratische Republik, or DDR). They were informally known as "West Germany" and "East Germany". However, prior to 1954, the Allies still officially retained responsibility for the whole of Germany and neither East Germany nor West Germany had regained their sovereignty.

The Basic Law for the Federal Republic of Germany, which came into effect in 1949, was written as a constitution for the whole of Germany, including West Germany and East Germany. It laid down German reunification as a goal and a requirement and was proclaimed in the name of the whole of the German people.

=== Soviet recognition of East Germany ===
On 23 March 1954, the Soviet Union declared that it would establish diplomatic relations with the German Democratic Republic. This was seen as giving the German Democratic Republic (East Germany) a degree of legitimacy as a separate state. The West German government in Bonn rejected this, claiming that the Federal Republic of Germany was the legitimate heir of the German Reich.

=== German sovereignty ===
After the ratification of the Paris Accords on 5 May 1955, the General Treaty (Deutschlandvertrag), which largely restored (West) German sovereignty, took effect.

=== Exclusive mandate ===
The government of the Federal Republic of Germany claimed to speak for the whole German people; this was re-iterated in a number of declarations. In the New York Declaration of 18 September 1951, the western occupying powers had declared that they "regard[ed] the government of the Federal Republic of Germany as the only German government freely and legitimately constituted and therefore entitled to speak for the German nation in international affairs".

The Federal Republic of Germany did not recognize the German Democratic Republic and maintained diplomatic relations with neither the German Democratic Republic nor the other Communist states of Eastern Europe.

== Origin of the "doctrine" ==
In 1955, Konrad Adenauer visited Moscow, where agreement was reached that the Federal Republic of Germany and the Soviet Union would establish diplomatic relations. This was obviously in the interest of the Federal Republic of Germany but—because the Soviet Union also maintained diplomatic relations with the German Democratic Republic—it was apparently inconsistent with the exclusive mandate policy, which insisted that other states should not maintain diplomatic relations with both German "states". There was therefore a need to publicly define the policy and reinforce the message that the Federal Republic would not accept any other states maintaining diplomatic relations with both the Federal Republic of Germany and the ("so-called") German Democratic Republic.

Walter Hallstein and Wilhelm Grewe were members of the delegation that accompanied Adenauer to Moscow. It was on the flight back from Moscow that the major elements of the policy were laid down, though elements of the policy had already been devised and practised by the Foreign Office before. Hallstein referred to the establishment of diplomatic relations with the Soviet Union in spite of the latter's recognition of East Germany as a "singular act" because of the Soviet Union's privileged status as an occupying power.

Adenauer talked of the policy in a press conference on 16 September 1955 and again in a government statement to the parliament on 22 September 1955, warning other states that establishing diplomatic relations with the German Democratic Republic would be regarded as an unfriendly act. On 8 December 1955, there was a meeting of the heads of all major German embassies and the leadership of the Foreign Office. The policy of non-recognition of the German Democratic Republic was one of the main points on the agenda. The text of the speeches by Foreign Minister Brentano, Hallstein and Grewe were later distributed to embassies worldwide.

=== Authorship and name ===
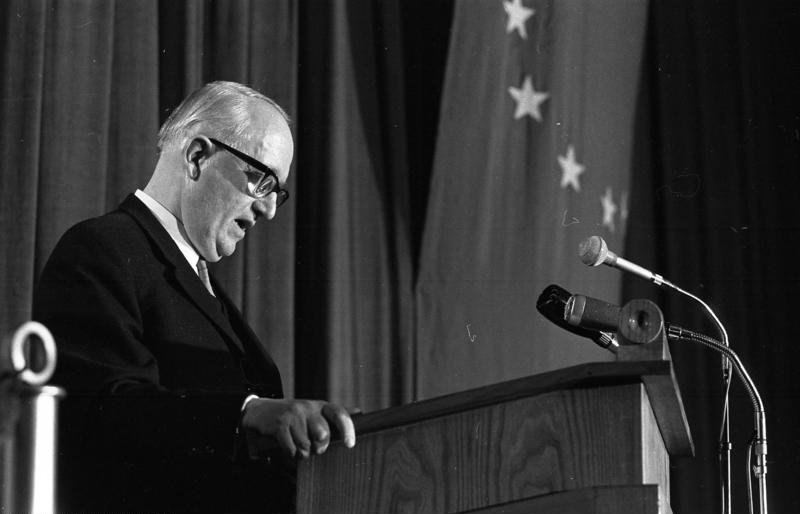
Walter Hallstein in 1969, accepting the Robert Schuman Prize

The Hallstein Doctrine was named after Walter Hallstein, then "state secretary" (the top civil servant) at the German Foreign Office, though largely devised and implemented by the head of the political department of the German Foreign Office, Wilhelm Grewe.

At the time the Hallstein Doctrine was born (or at least named), Heinrich von Brentano was the foreign minister, a post that had been recently created, after West Germany largely regained its sovereignty in 1955—before this, political responsibility for foreign policy had been retained by the chancellor, Konrad Adenauer. Brentano is also known to have referred to the policy, or a variation of it as the Brentano Doctrine.

Some time later, in 1958, journalists named the policy the Hallstein–Grewe Doctrine, and this later became shortened to the Hallstein Doctrine. Grewe himself writes that he devised the broad outlines of the policy, but mainly as one of a number of options, the decisions being made by the foreign minister, Brentano, and the chancellor, Adenauer; in any case, the name Hallstein doctrine may be something of a misnomer.

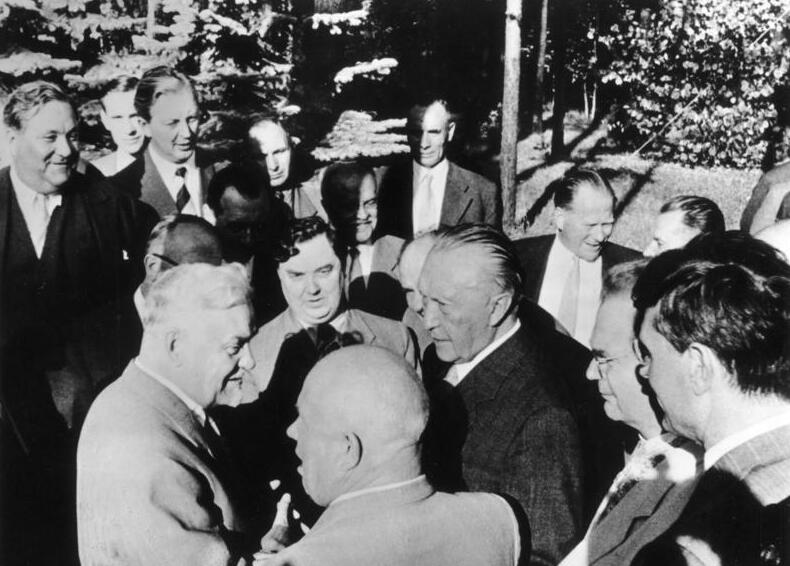
Konrad Adenauer in Moscow, 1955

== Content and rationale ==
The Hallstein Doctrine followed from the Federal Republic's claimed exclusive mandate to represent the whole of Germany (the Alleinvertretungsanspruch). It specified that the Federal German government would regard it as an unfriendly act (acte peu amical) if third countries were to recognize the "German Democratic Republic" (East Germany) or maintain diplomatic relations with it—with the exception of the Soviet Union, as one of the Four Powers responsible for Germany. The response to such an unfriendly act was often understood to mean breaking off diplomatic relations, but this was not stated as an automatic response under the policy, though it remained the ultima ratio.

Which actions short of official recognition and full diplomatic relations would trigger sanctions, and what these sanctions would be, was deliberately kept unclear—at least publicly—in order to prevent foreign governments testing the limits. Grewe warned privately that flexibility was essential and that it was not possible to pretend that the state-like entity of East Germany did not exist and gave the diplomatic service guidance on what sort of activities would be tolerated under the policy.

Neither full diplomatic relations nor consular relations with similar recognition (exequatur) would be tolerated. The same applied to treaties that did not contain special provisos specifying that the treaty did not imply recognition. However, normal commercial activities, including non-state trade representations, etc. would be tolerated. There was also a considerable grey area open to interpretation. While Grewe was somewhat circumspect, the foreign minister, Brentano, made it clear that – regardless of the economic consequences – the Federal Republic would immediately break off diplomatic relations with any state that recognized the German Democratic Republic de jure or recognized the "reality of two German states".

== Legal basis ==
A legal expert produced a legal opinion setting out that the Soviet declaration (initiating diplomatic relations with the German Democratic Republic) had finally separated the Soviet Zone from the three western zones, but that, since it was under the control of the Soviet Union, it had no separate state government and therefore did not meet the minimum requirements of statehood. The legal opinion went on to claim that any state that had established diplomatic relations with the Federal Republic of Germany or had declared an end of the state of war had implicitly recognized the Federal Republic as having an exclusive mandate to represent Germany.

The western allies, in various agreements, including the General Treaty of 1955, had agreed to recognize only the Federal Republic of Germany. The western occupying powers (France, Britain, and the United States) accepted the continued existence of the pre-existing German State; and the New York Declaration of 18 September 1950 stated that they "regard[ed] the government of the Federal Republic of Germany as the only German government freely and legitimately constituted and therefore entitled to speak for the German nation in international affairs". An unpublished "interpretative minute" produced at the same time clarifies that the formula did not constitute recognition of the Government of the Federal Republic as the de jure government of all Germany".

The legal justification for the policy was that there was an obligation (based on the constitution and the General Treaty, to strive for German re-unification and therefore to avoid or prevent recognition of East Germany and thus the division of Germany. The political arguments were: that recognition implied acceptance of the division of Germany; that non-recognition meant rejection of the status quo; that non-recognition gave moral support to the population of East Germany in rejecting the Communist regime; that non-recognition weakened the international standing of the German Democratic Republic and the Soviet Union and increased the standing of the Federal Republic of Germany; and that recognition of the German Democratic Republic would not lead to reunification because the other side would not be expected to commit political suicide.

== Reaction of the German Democratic Republic ("East Germany") ==
In the beginning, the German Democratic Republic had pressed for re-unification, though they were not willing to accept free elections with UN participation. From about 1955, they favoured a "two state" solution and strongly objected to the Federal Republic's claim to represent the whole of Germany; but they made no such claims themselves. In the 1960s, after the building of the Berlin Wall, Walter Ulbricht, the East German leader increasingly claimed to represent the whole of Germany.

Whenever the German Democratic Republic opened some form of representation in another country, they attempted to persuade that country to open a similar representation in the German Democratic Republic. Although they were willing to provide financial inducements for this purpose, their success was limited. For the first stage in developing diplomatic relations, the German Democratic Republic often used the assistance of the local communist party in the country, and East German journalists were also pressed into service. The next stage was to establish a trade agreement. This was not especially problematic, because the Federal Republic of Germany did not object to trade relations, providing it did not involve explicit diplomatic recognition. Having established trade relations, the next stage was to establish permanent offices of the chamber of commerce. This, too, usually met with little resistance from the Federal Republic of Germany, provided the entities involved were not formally organs of the state. The next stage was to establish trade representations. These were usually tolerated by the Federal Republic of Germany, as long as there were no visible indications of diplomatic privileges, such as flying the official flag or pennant or invitation to official events normally reserved to the diplomatic corps. The German Democratic Republic increasingly used these for consular purposes and tried to "upgrade" them diplomatically by calling them "trade missions" and using diplomatic titles for their officers. This met with resistance on the part of the Federal Republic of Germany. The final stage that the German Democratic Republic aimed for was to establish a consulate general. This usually involved issuing an exequatur, a document that guarantees the consul's rights and privileges. This was regarded by the Federal Republic of Germany as equivalent to official diplomatic recognition and could be expected to be met with sanctions of some form. Countries such as Egypt attempted to avoid upsetting either side by issuing an exequatur but adding a note that it did not imply recognition of the German Democratic Republic.

Right up to 1969, however, the German Democratic Republic was not able to achieve full diplomatic representation – with two possible exceptions:

- In March 1960, an ambassador from Guinea formally presented his papers to the East German head of state, President Wilhelm Pieck. After protests from the Federal Republic of Germany, however, the Guineans claimed there had been a mistake and an ambassador of the German Democratic Republic was never accredited by Guinea.
- In 1963, the island of Zanzibar had gained independence from Britain, and in early 1964 there was a revolution, leading to the establishment of the People's Republic of Zanzibar and Pemba, which agreed to diplomatic relations with the German Democratic Republic. In April 1964, however, the new republic merged with Tanganyika, the resulting state being soon renamed the United Republic of Tanzania, and the German Democratic Republic had to close its embassy.

== History of the Hallstein Doctrine ==
The doctrine was applied twice, to Yugoslavia in 1957, and to Cuba in 1963. Both had first recognized the GDR.

In 1958 the newly founded republic of Guinea accepted a Federal German ambassador and a GDR trade mission. When the country in 1960 sent an ambassador to GDR, the Federal Republic withdrew its own. Guinea then declared that it had never sent an ambassador to the GDR.

=== Problems of the doctrine ===
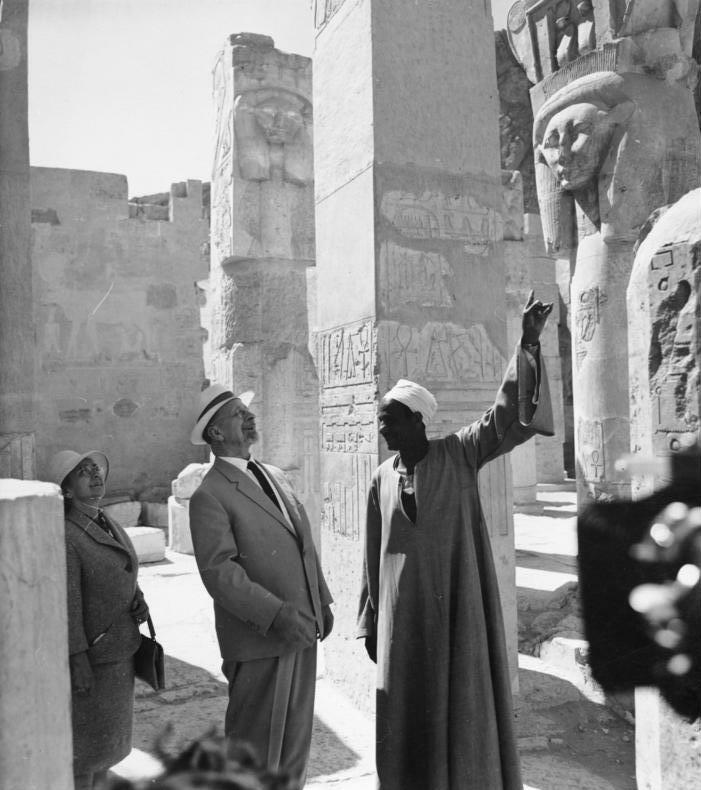
GDR leader Walter Ulbricht in 1965 visiting Egypt

The doctrine seemed to succeed for a long time in isolating the GDR, at least from important Western or Third World states. But it also limited the federal government's politics, and in the 1960s it became more and more difficult to maintain.

In several cases, the doctrine was in fact not applied. When, in 1957, the GDR opened an office in Cairo to establish contact with the entire Arab world, the Federal Republic did not withdraw its ambassador from Egypt. Moreover, when in 1965 the Federal Republic established diplomatic relations with Israel, many Arab states ceased theirs with the Federal Republic but did not recognise the GDR. This eventually happened after 1967, because the GDR had supported the Arab states in the Six-Day War. The doctrine was also not applied to Cambodia in 1969, although it had recognised the GDR.

The Federal Republic established diplomatic relations with Romania in 1967 and reestablished those with Yugoslavia in 1968. The government's argument was that the communist states had been in fact forced to recognise the GDR and should not be punished for that.

== Abolition ==
In 1969 Willy Brandt became German Chancellor as head of a social democrat / liberal government. The new government maintained the main political goals such as the German reunification in peace and freedom, but it altered the way to achieve these goals. Brandt's new Ostpolitik was a policy of negotiating with the German Democratic Republic government in order to improve the situation of Germans in German Democratic Republic and involved supporting visits from one part of Germany to the other. As part of this, the Federal Republic de jure recognized the German Democratic Republic as a state organisation of parts of Germany not within the Federal Republic, emphasizing that both German states could not be "foreign" to each other, that their relationships could be only of a special kind.

The Four Power Agreement on Berlin in 1971 and the signing of the Basic Treaty in 1972 brought an end to the doctrine, in accordance with the new strategy of Ostpolitik.

== Similar situations ==
In diplomacy the non-recognition of another state, and the discouraging of third states to do the same, is a common tactic. In the first years after the establishment of the Soviet Union and the People's Republic of China, the United States refused to have diplomatic contact with them. Similar exclusive mandate policies (One-China policy) are still pursued by the People's Republic of China and the Republic of China (on Taiwan), and the situation in Vietnam during the Vietnam War was somewhat similar.

== Novel approach ==
In 2016, Torben Gülstorff gave a new interpretation of the Hallstein doctrine. According to him, the doctrine's impact on the West and the East German foreign policy was only marginal, more myth than reality. During the entire Cold War, national economic and international geostrategic interests dominated German foreign affairs – on both sides of the wall.

== See also ==
- Ulbricht Doctrine
- Brezhnev Doctrine
- Sinatra Doctrine
- Truman Doctrine
- One China
