= Ulbricht Doctrine =

East German diplomatic doctrine, Cold War

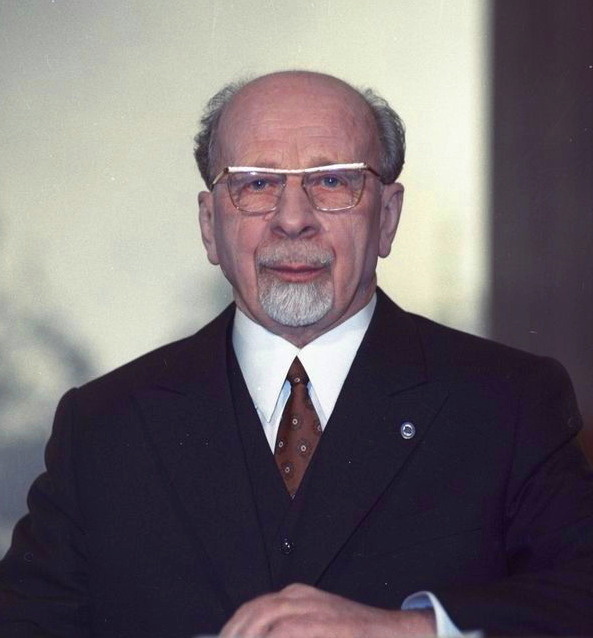
Walter Ulbricht

The Ulbricht Doctrine, named after East German leader Walter Ulbricht, was the assertion that normal diplomatic relations between East Germany and West Germany could occur only if both states fully recognised each other's sovereignty. That contrasted with the Hallstein Doctrine, a West German policy which insisted that West Germany was the only legitimate German state.

East Germany gained acceptance of its view from fellow Communist states, such as Czechoslovakia, Poland, Hungary, and Bulgaria, which all agreed not to normalise relations with West Germany until it recognised East German sovereignty.

West Germany eventually abandoned its Hallstein Doctrine, instead adopting the policies of Ostpolitik. In December 1972, a Basic Treaty between East and West Germany was signed that reaffirmed two German states as separate entities. The treaty also allowed the exchange of diplomatic missions and the entry of both German states to the United Nations as full members.
