= Michael Kilian (German academic) =

German legal scholar

Michael Kilian (born 13 February 1949) is a German legal scholar and a former justice of the Constitutional Court of Saxony-Anhalt. Until 1982 he was the private secretary of Walter Hallstein, who was the President of the Commission of the European Economic Community.

== Life ==
Kilian was born 13 February 1949 in Geislingen an der Steige.

In 1985 Kilian was awarded his doctorate (Dr jur.) on the basis of a dissertation on "Environmantal Protection by International Organizations" (Umweltschutz durch Internationale Organisationen), supervised by Thomas Oppermann and Wolfgang Graf Vitzthum. In 1990, he obtained his habilitation in public finance law at the University of Tübingen based on a dissertation on the topic "Parallel Budgets of the Federal Government" (Nebenhaushalte des Bundes), supervised by Thomas Oppermann und Ferdinand Kirchhof. In 1990 he was appointed a full professor at the University of Heidelberg. Since 1992 Kilian has taught at the Martin-Luther-Universität Halle-Wittenberg, where he holds the chair for Public Law, Public International and European Law, Financial and Environmental Law. From 1993 to 2000 Kilian was a justice at the Constitutional Court of Saxony-Anhalt.

Kilian is joint editor-in-chief of the journal Zeitschrift zum Stiftungswesen and a member of the board of the Leucorea Foundation in Wittenberg. As well as topics from his legal field, he has published works on political and legal topics related to the state of Saxony-Anhalt and connections of his subject to literature, aesthetics, and history. He writes himself that he attempts to draw attention to the state's little-known artistic and cultural treasures".

== Works ==
- Umweltschutz durch internationale Organisationen. Die Antwort des Völkerrechts auf die Krise der Umwelt? Tübinger Schriften zum internationalen und europäischen Recht, Vol. 13. Duncker & Humblot, Berlin 1987, ISBN 3-428-06151-9. Also: doctoral dissertation at the University of Tübingen, 1986. (in German)
- Nebenhaushalte des Bundes. Tübinger Schriften zum Staats- und Verwaltungsrecht, Bd. 18. Duncker & Humblot, Berlin 1993, ISBN 3-428-07818-7. Also: habilitation dissertation at the University of Tübingen, 1986. (in German)
- (Editor) Sachsen-Anhalt. Land der Mitte – Land im Aufbau. Die Entstehung eines neuen Bundeslandes in Erlebnisberichten. Bock, Bad Honnef 2002, ISBN 3-87066-873-3. (in German)
- (with Enrico Bellezza, Klaus Vogel) Der Staat als Stifter. Stiftungen als Public-Private Partnerships im Kulturbereich. Bertelsmann Foundation, Gütersloh 2003, ISBN 3-89204-667-0.
- (mit Michael Germann) Verfassungshandbuch Sachsen-Anhalt. Nomos, Baden-Baden 2004, ISBN 3-8329-0465-4. (in German)
- Das Land ohne Gesicht. Gestaltungsarmut und Formenlosigkeit der deutschen Republik. In: Otto Depenheuer (editor): Staat und Schönheit. Möglichkeiten und Perspektiven einer Staatskalokagathie. Verlag für Sozialwissenschaften, Wiesbaden 2005, ISBN 3-531-14768-4, S. 145–178. (in German)
- Jenseits von Bologna – Jurisprudentia literarisch. Von Woyzeck bis Weimar, von Hoffmann bis Luhmann. Berliner Wissenschafts-Verlag, Berlin 2006, ISBN 3-8305-1270-8. (in German)
- Die Rekonstruktion von verlorenen Baudenkmalen. Wiederherstellung und Bewahrung einer ästhetischen Umwelt? Ein Plädoyer zur Ausformung eines erweiterten Denkmalschutzbegriffs. In: Jörn Ipsen, Bernhard Stüer (ed.): Europa im Wandel. Festschrift für Hans-Werner Rengeling zum 70. Geburtstag am 25. Februar 2008. Heymanns, Cologne, 2008, ISBN 3-452-26801-2, pp. 105–126. (in German)
- (with Claus Eiselstein) Grundfälle im Staatsrecht. Ein methodischer Kurs zur Einführung in das Öffentliche Recht. 5., komplett überarbeitete Auflage, Facultas, Wien 2011, ISBN 978-3-8252-3615-1. (in German)
