= Wilfried Loth =

German historian (born 1948)

- Born: 29 August 1948 (age 78); Wadern, Saar Protectorate
- Education: Saarland University
- Occupations: Historian; political scientist

Wilfried Loth (born 29 August 1948) is a German historian and political scientist.

== Life ==
Wilfried Loth was born 29 August 1948 in Wadern.

From 1966 to 1972, he studied German studies, History, Philosophy and Education at Saarland University. He obtained his doctorate in 1974. From 1974 to 1984 he worked there as an assistant lecturer and in 1983 he obtained his habilitation in Modern history with a dissertation on Catholics in the German Empire: Political Catholicism in the Crisis of Wilhelminian Germany. From 1984 to 1985 he was Professor of Political Science at the Free University of Berlin, then Professor of Political Science at the University of Münster from 1985 to 1986. From 1986 to 2014 he was Professor of Modern History at the University of Essen. From 1993 to 1997, Loth was President of the Institute for Advanced Studies in the Humanities (Kulturwissenschaftliches Institut) in Essen at the North Rhine-Westphalia Academic Centre. From 2012 to 2014 he was President of the Franco-German Committee of Historians. In 2013 he was awarded an honorary doctorate from the Babeș-Bolyai University in the Romanian town of Cluj-Napoca.

His major academic interests include: the history of Catholicism and of Socialism, the history of the German Empire, the history of France in the twentieth century, the history of the Cold War, and the history of European integration. One of his controversial positions is that on the Stalin Note of 1952, which he regarded as more serious than the majority of historians.

== Works ==
His works include:

- Loth, Wilfried (2012). Europe, Cold War and Coexistence, 1955-1965. Taylor & Francis. ISBN 9781135771485.
- Lipgens, W.; Loth, W. (1988). Documents on the History of European Integration: The struggle for European Union by political parties and pressure groups in western European countries, 1945-1950. De Gruyter. ISBN 9783110114294.
- Loth, W. (1988). The Division of the World, 1941-1955. Routledge. ISBN 9780415003650.
- Loth, Wilfried (1998). "Hallstein und de Gaulle: the Disastrous Confrontation". In Loth, Wilfried; Wallace, William; Wessels, Wolfgang (eds.). Walter Hallstein: The Forgotten European?. Forewords by Jacques Delors, Sir Edward Heath, and Helmut Kohl; translated from the German by Bryan Ruppert. New York: St. Martin's Press. pp. 135–150. ISBN 978-031221293-3.
- Die Teilung der Welt. Geschichte des Kalten Krieges 1941–1955, new revised edition, dtv, Munich 2000, ISBN 3-423-30756-0. (standard work, first published 1980)
- Geschichte Frankreichs im 20. Jahrhundert. Fischer, Frankfurt 1995, ISBN 3-596-10860-8
- Stalins ungeliebtes Kind. Warum Moskau die DDR nicht wollte [Stalin's Unwanted Child: Why Moscow Didn't Want the GDR], (in German) Rowohlt, Berlin 1994 ISBN 3-87134-085-5
- Das Kaiserreich. Obrigkeitsstaat und politische Mobilisierung, dtv, Munich 1996, ISBN 3-423-04505-1
- Die Sowjetunion und die deutsche Frage. Studien zur sowjetischen Deutschlandpolitik von Stalin bis Chruschtschow, Vandenhoeck & Ruprecht, Göttingen 2007, ISBN 3-525-36298-6

Chapters in:

- Deutscher Katholizismus im Umbruch zur Moderne, Kohlhammer, Stuttgart 1991, ISBN 3-17-011729-7.
- Wilhelm Pieck. Aufzeichnungen zur Deutschlandpolitik 1945–1953, Akademie Verlag, Berlin 1994 ISBN 3-050-02198-5 (with Rolf Badstübner)
- Verwandlungspolitik: NS-Eliten in der westdeutschen Nachkriegsgesellschaft, Frankfurt am Main 1998, ISBN 3-593-35994-4. (with Bernd-A. Rusinek)
- Das europäische Projekt zu Beginn des 21. Jahrhunderts, Leske + Budrich), Opladen 2001, ISBN 3-8100-2908-4.
- Entwürfe einer europäischen Verfassung. Eine historische Bilanz, Europa-Union-Verlag, Bonn 2002, ISBN 3-7713-0604-3.
- Europäische Gesellschaft. Grundlagen und Perspektiven, Verlag für Sozialwissenschaften, Wiesbaden 2005, ISBN 3-531-14758-7.
- together with Jost Dülffer: Dimensionen internationaler Geschichte, Oldenbourg, Munich 2012, ISBN 978-3-486-71260-5.
- States and the Changing Equations of Power, in Global Interdependence: The World After 1945, Akira Iriye, ed. (Cambridge, MA: Harvard University Press, 2014).
