= Robert Schuman Prize, Alfred Toepfer Foundation =

The Robert Schuman Prize for European unity was a prize awarded annually by the Hamburg Alfred Toepfer Foundation, in memory of former French Prime Minister Robert Schuman. The award, first given in 1966, was discontinued in 2000.

The Robert Schuman Silver Medal for European Unity was awarded at the Robert Schuman Prize ceremony. It was awarded to people between the ages of 18 and 35 who particularly distinguished themselves through their efforts towards European harmony.
