= Mariya Gabriel =

Bulgarian politician (born 1979)

- Мария Габриел
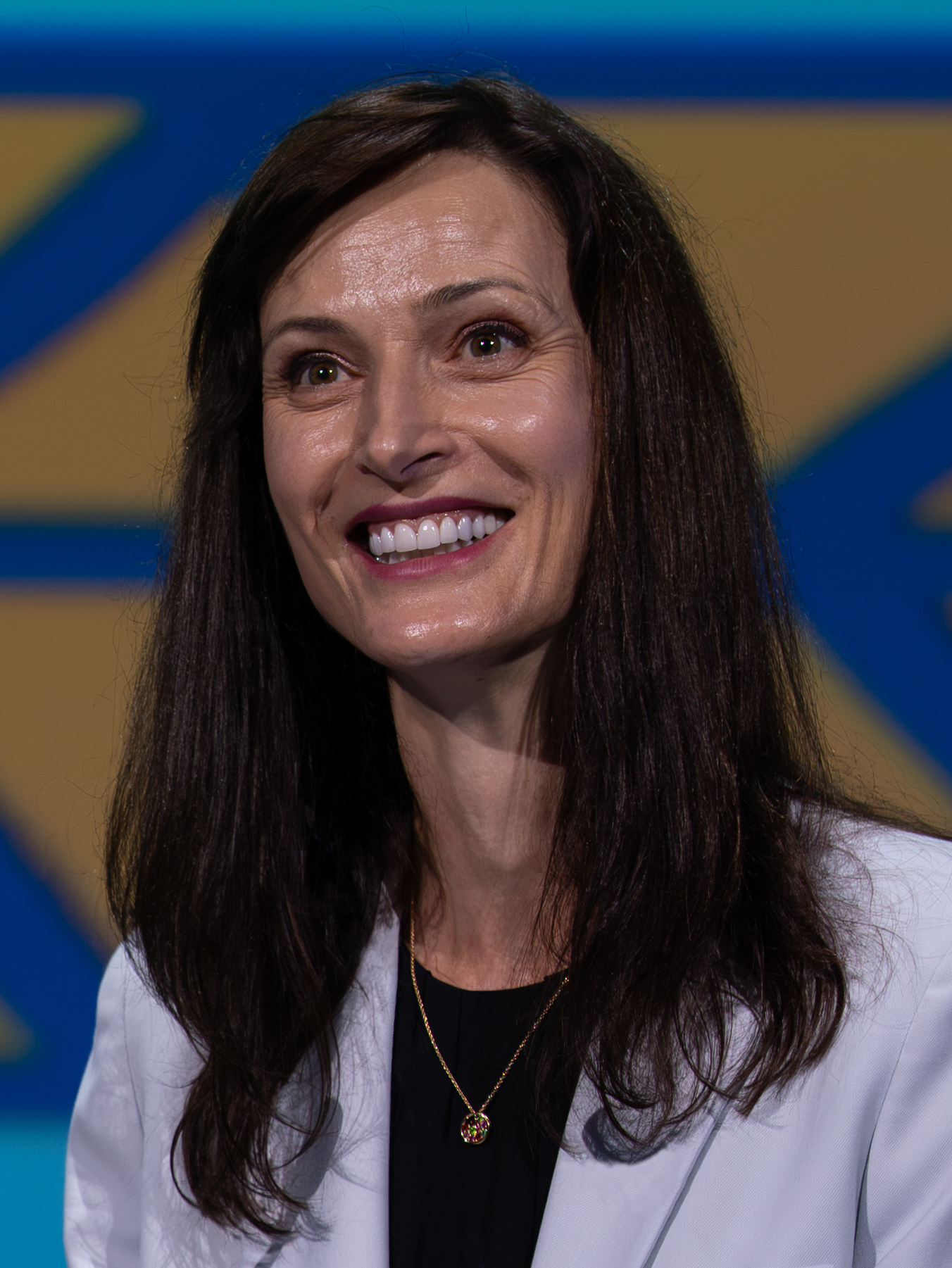
- Gabriel in 2026

Assistant Director General of UNESCO for Communication and Information
- Incumbent
- Assumed office 1 March 2026
- Preceded by: Tawfik Jelassi

Deputy Prime Minister of Bulgaria
- In office 6 June 2023 – 9 April 2024
- Prime Minister: Nikolai Denkov
- Preceded by: Atanas Pekanov (Note: Portfolio split between Pekanov, Ivan Demerdzhiev, Hristo Alexiev and Lazar Lazarov)
- Succeeded by: Lyudmila Petkova

Minister of Foreign Affairs
- In office 6 June 2023 – 9 April 2024
- Prime Minister: Nikolai Denkov
- Preceded by: Ivan Kondov
- Succeeded by: Stefan Dimitrov

European Commissioner for Innovation, Research, Culture, Education and Youth
- In office 1 December 2019 – 15 May 2023 (Note: On leave: 10 May 2023 – 15 May 2023 (Gabriel's portfolio was split by Schinas and Vestager during her leave and vacancy. When Vestager took her own leave during the vacancy, the rest of the portfolio was given to Schinas in the interim.))
- Commission: Von der Leyen I
- Preceded by: Tibor Navracsics (Note: As Commissioner for Education, Culture, Youth and Sport)
- Succeeded by: Iliana Ivanova

European Commissioner for Digital Economy and Society
- In office 7 July 2017 – 30 November 2019
- Commission: Juncker
- Preceded by: Günther Oettinger
- Succeeded by: Margrethe Vestager (Note: As Commissioner for Digital Age)

Member of the European Parliament for Bulgaria
- In office 14 July 2009 – 6 July 2017
- Preceded by: Nikolay Mladenov
- Succeeded by: Asim Ademov

Personal details
- Born: Mariya Ivanova Nedelcheva; 20 May 1979 (age 47) Hadzhidimovo, PR Bulgaria
- Party: GERB
- Other political affiliations: European People's Party
- Spouse: François Gabriel (m. 2012)
- Children: 1
- Education: Plovdiv University (BA); Institute of Political Studies, Bordeaux (MA)
- Occupation: Politician; political scientist

Mariya Ivanova Gabriel (Bulgarian: Мария Иванова Габриел, née Nedelcheva, Bulgarian: Неделчева, born 20 May 1979) is a Bulgarian politician, president of the Robert Schuman Institute. Since March 2026, she has been serving as the Assistant Director-General for Communication and Information at UNESCO. She served as Deputy Prime Minister of Bulgaria and Minister of Foreign Affairs from 2023 to 2024. A member of the GERB party, she previously served as European Commissioner for Innovation, Research, Culture, Education and Youth from 2019 to 2023, European Commissioner for Digital Economy and Society from 2017 to 2019 and Member of the European Parliament from 2009 to 2017.

In the European Parliament she served as vice-president of the European People's Party (EPP) group, vice-president of EPP Women and head of the Bulgarian EPP delegation. She was first appointed to the European Commission in 2017 as European Commissioner for Digital Economy and Society to fill a spot left vacant by the departure of Kristalina Georgieva. Gabriel left with a mixed record and reputation in Brussels. In particular, she struggled to realize a €415 billion plan to make the EU a global tech hub.

On 22 May 2023, a coalition of GERB and We Continue the Change – Democratic Bulgaria (PP-DB) agreed to form a government with two rotating prime ministers, Nikolai Denkov and Gabriel.

== Education ==
Mariya Gabriel was born on 20 May 1979 in Hadzhidimovo, Blagoevgrad Province. In 1997, she graduated from the Dr Petar Beron language high school in Kyustendil. In 2001 she graduated from the Plovdiv University "Paisii Hilendarski". She continued her studies at the Institut d'études politiques de Bordeaux (Institute of Political Studies) in Bordeaux (France), where she obtained a master's degree in 'Comparative Politics and International Relations'. From 2004 to 2008, Mariya Gabriel was a teaching and research assistant at the Institute of Political Studies in Bordeaux (France). Her teaching assignment was related to the topics of the Decision-Making process in the EU, Political Sociology and International Relations.

== Career ==
=== Member of the European Parliament ===
==== Vice-President of the EPP Group and Head of the Bulgarian delegation of the EPP Group ====
From 2014 to 2017, Mariya Gabriel was vice-president of the EPP Group and Head of the Bulgarian delegation in the EPP Group. As vice-president of the EPP Group she chaired the Euromed Working Group of the EPP and was responsible for maintaining the EPP Group's relations with countries from the Mediterranean, Middle East and North Africa regions.

==== Committee work ====
As member of the Committee on Civil Liberties, Justice and Home Affairs, Mariya Gabriel focused her activities on the migration policy of the European Union, Schengen, visa liberalisation agreements with third countries, security issues, the fight against terrorism and human trafficking. She followed closely topics related to FRONTEX and the Entry-Exit System of the EU.

In the Foreign Affairs Committee Mariya Gabriel's focus was on the Mediterranean countries, and relations between the EU and Africa, the Middle East and the countries from the Arab Peninsula. She was a negotiator of the EPP Group on a regular basis for resolutions related to human rights violations, democracy and the rule of law. She upheld the need for improved consistency of the foreign and internal policies of the EU, conflict prevention and conflict resolution, migration and security, economic links, and development policy.

From 2012 until 2014 Mariya Gabriel was a coordinator of the EPP Group in the Women's Rights and Gender Equality Committee. She was the rapporteur of the European Parliament on the proposed Women on Boards directive.

During the 2009–2014 legislature Mariya Gabriel was a member of the Committee on Agriculture and Rural Development and was actively working on the reform of the new EU common agricultural policy (CAP) for the 2014–2020 period. As part of her work, she defended the principles of a fair, flexible and simplified agricultural policy.

From 2014 to 2017, Mariya Gabriel was President of the Working Group on Apiculture and Bee Health. In 2015 and 2016 she organised the European Week of Bees and Pollination in the European Parliament. In 2016 Albert II, Prince of Monaco, was a keynote speaker.

Mariya Gabriel worked on the Danube Strategy as a strategically important topic for the EU. It is a strategy for the Danube macro-region, which covers nine Member States (Austria, Bulgaria, Croatia, Czech Republic, Germany, Hungary, Romania, Slovakia and Slovenia) and 5 non-EU states (Serbia, Bosnia and Herzegovina, Montenegro, Ukraine and Moldova).

==== EU foreign policy ====
From 2009 Mariya Gabriel was an active member of the ACP-EU Joint Parliamentary Assembly, which brings together parliamentarians from the African, Caribbean and Pacific Group of States and the European Union. In 2011 she was Head of the EU Election Observation Mission for the presidential and parliamentary elections in the Democratic Republic of Congo. In 2016 Mariya Gabriel led the EU Election Observation Mission for the presidential elections in Gabon.

=== European Commission ===
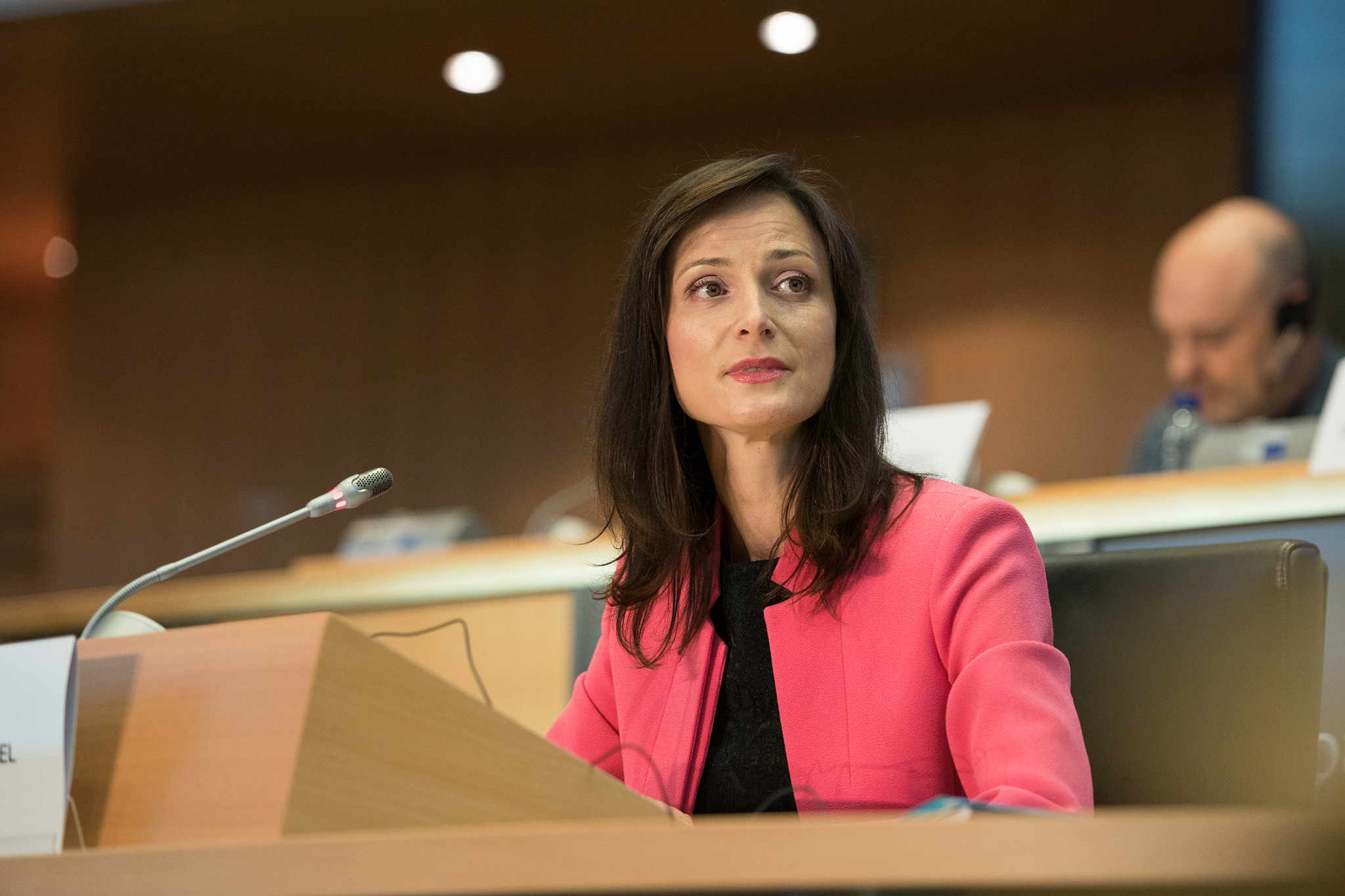
Gabriel testifies before the European Parliament in 2019

On 10 May 2017 Jean-Claude Juncker, President of the European Commission, announced that Bulgarian Prime Minister Boyko Borisov had nominated Mariya Gabriel to replace Kristalina Georgieva as Commissioner.

President Juncker appointed Günther Oettinger to replace Georgieva as European Commissioner for Budget and Human Resources, leaving Gabriel with the digital portfolio Oettinger had previously headed.

In 2019, Ursula von der Leyen nominated Gabriel to be European Commissioner for Innovation, Research, Culture, Education and Youth.

=== Return to national politics ===
==== GERB PM candidate & Rotation Agreement (May 2023) ====
On 10 May 2023, GERB announced that their PM nominee was Mariya Gabriel. Holding a briefing with GERB-SDS Parliamentary Group, on the 11th of May, Gabriel outlined some of her policy priorities, specifically including judicial reform and the removal of General-Prosecutor Ivan Geshev. This was widely seen as a move to attract the support of the second largest group in the National Assembly, PPDB.

Following the outlining of her priorities, Gabriel undertook consultations with a number of parliamentary represented parties who could support her government: PP-DB, DPS, BSP and ITN. Despite attempts to find commonalities during her meeting with the representatives of PP-DB, specifically urging them to support a joint Euro-atlanicist government, PP-DB insisted they could not support a government formed with a GERB mandate, thus leading Gabriel to search for an alternative majority. However, while DPS and ITN signaled their willingness to support an "expert cabinet" headed by Gabriel, BSP expressed reservations about supporting such a cabinet, thus increasing the difficulty of finding a majority excluding PP-DB.

President Radev officially gave Gabriel the first mandate to try to form a government on 15 May that same year. With Gabriel resigning the position of European Commissioner on the same day.

In the following days, ITN officially announced their decision to support the Gabriel government, however this still left the prospective Gabriel cabinet 5 seats short of a majority in the National Assembly, as BSP had announced they would not vote in favour of the Gabriel cabinet.

Following the official confirmation of support from ITN, Gabriel confirmed she would fulfil the first mandate and present her cabinet during a meeting with the President on the 22nd of May. However, these plans were derailed by the sudden announcement by ITN that they would be withdrawing support for the prospective Gabriel cabinet. Thus leading Mariya Gabriel to return an unfulfilled mandate on the 22nd of May to the Presidency and announce her intention to support the formation of a government with the second mandate.

On 22 May 2023, a coalition of GERB and We Continue the Change – Democratic Bulgaria (PP-DB) agreed to form a government with two rotating prime ministers, Nikolai Denkov and Gabriel.

On the 27th of May, the formation of the rotation government was almost derailed by the leak of audio-tapes from a closed door PP-DB meeting, the contents of which led Mariya Gabriel to announce a temporary suspension of negotiations until PP-DB can demonstrate a new approach to government formation. Unofficial contact between the two parties, specifically between Denkov and Gabriel, did however continue.

On the 30th of May, Gabriel outlined the terms for renewed negotiations, specifically insisting on a "rethinking" of the composition of the prospective Denkov cabinet to include more experts.

On the 31st of May, negotiations were officially reopened between the two parties.

On the 2nd of June, an official cabinet was announced in a joint briefing between Gabriel and Denkov, with the rotation principle similarly confirmed. The Denkov Government was approved on the 6th of June and began its tenure shortly thereafter, with Mariya Gabriel serving as Vice-Prime Minister and Minister for Foreign Affairs.

==== Rotation Cabinet negotiations (March 2024) ====
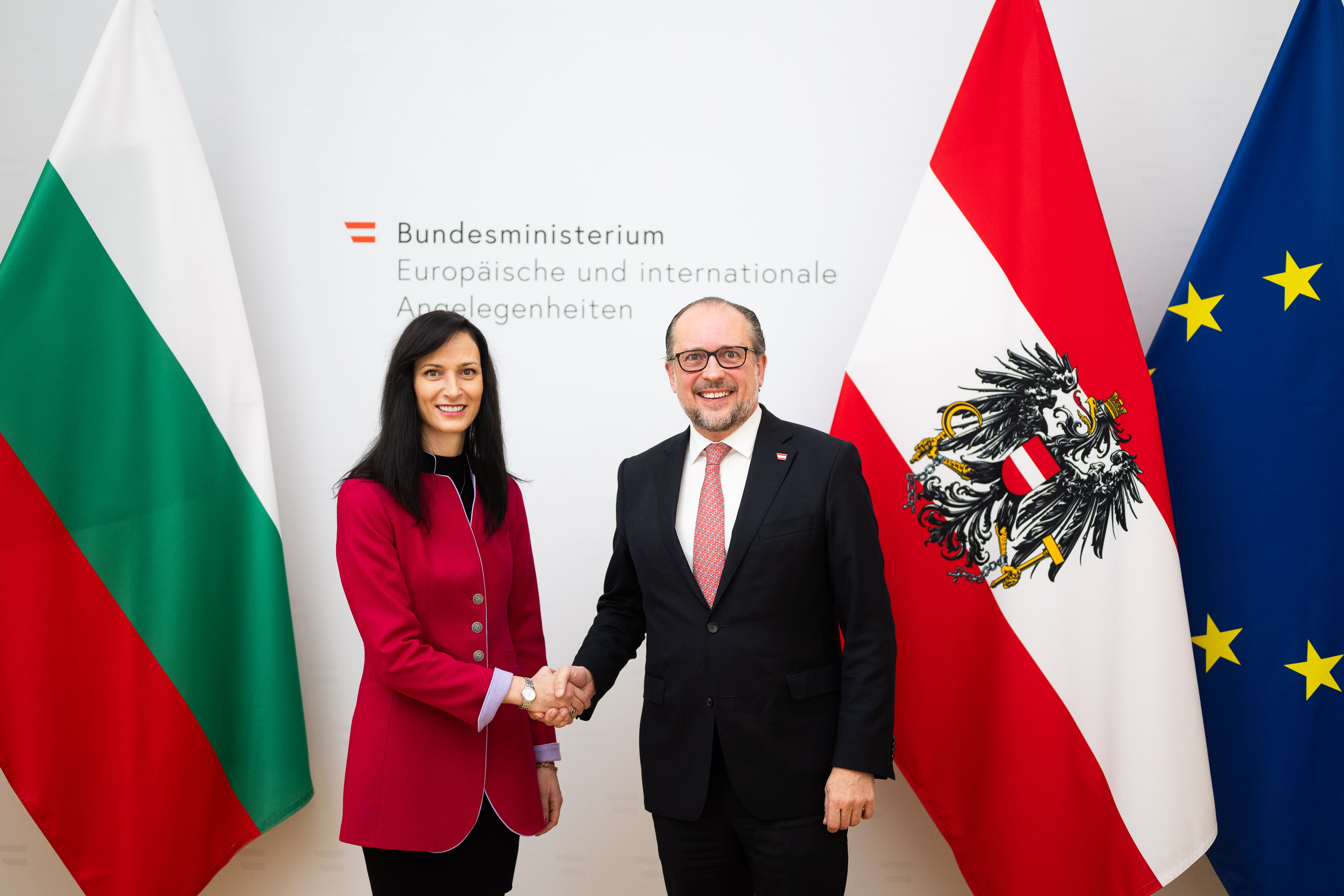
Gabriel with her Austrian counterpart, Alexander Schallenberg, in November 2023.

On 6 March 2024, Denkov resigned as part of the power-sharing agreement with Gabriel.

Shortly thereafter, GERB leader, Boyko Borissov, announced that Mariya Gabriel would head a negotiation team in order to reach an agreement for continued co-governance.

Negotiations between the two parties officially began on the 9th of March, with a focus on signing an official governance deal and a potential reshuffle of certain ministers.

During consultations with the President on the 11th of March, Gabriel informed the President about the negotiations, however requested more time in order to reach a final agreement. Following the consultations, Gabriel confirmed that a number of differences still remained between PP-DB and GERB.

While negotiations continued for the rest of the following week, on the 17th of March, one day before the President was due to issue the first mandate, Gabriel announced that "fundamental differences" had emerged between PPDB and GERB, and that if the attitude of PP–DB did not change, she would return the first mandate unfulfilled.

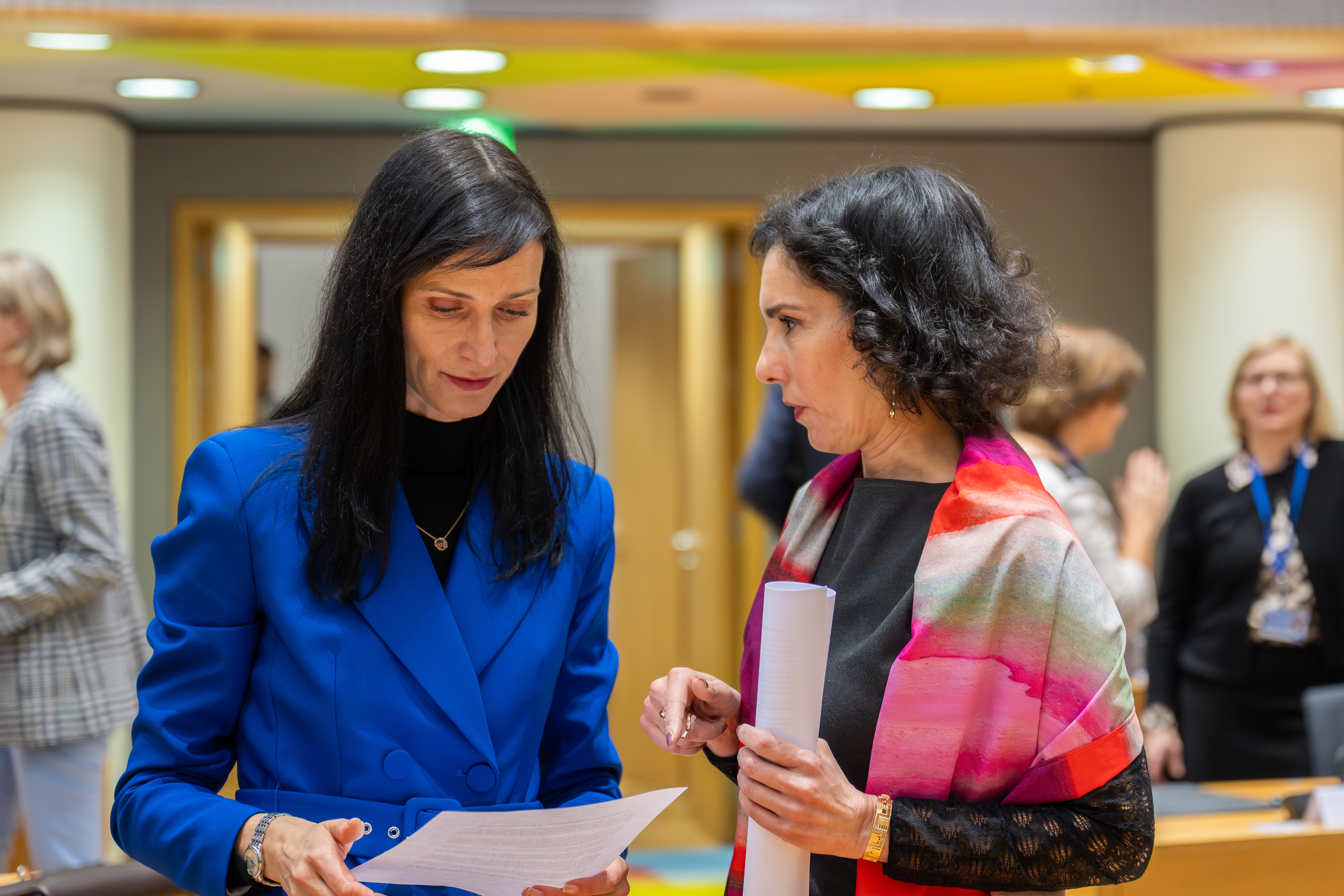
Gabriel at the Council of the European Union in February 2024.

On 18 March, President Rumen Radev formally gave Gabriel the first mandate, with Gabriel receiving the first mandate in the presence of a joint delegation of PPDB and GERB leaders. Leaving the Presidential institution, Gabriel confirmed that talks would be allowed to continue, however insisted that negotiations would not continue for more than 24 hours and that she would return the mandate to the President the next day.

Gabriel returned the mandate completed to the President on the 19th of March, citing the need for a stable government in order to complete key policy priorities. The proposed cabinet had a number of significant changes compared to the Denkov Government, including the appointment of GERB MPs, Hristo Gadzhev as Minister of Defense, and Zhecho Stankov as Minister of Energy. In comments to the press following the completion of the first mandate, however, Gabriel did not confirm if the government had been presented with the approval of PPDB, with it being further confirmed that the proposed "Governance Agreement" had only been signed by Mariya Gabriel.

Subsequently, PP–DB held a press briefing at which they announced that they had not agreed to the government, leading to most of their ministers declaring their intention to not participate in a Gabriel cabinet. During the briefing, PP co-leader and Acting Finance Minister, Assen Vassilev, called Mariya Gabriel "the new, more beautiful face of the mafia in Bulgaria".

On 20 March, Gabriel made a comment to the press justifying her decision to propose the ministers without their prior approval by referencing the parameters of the original governance agreement, in which all ministers had committed to serve in that capacity for 18 months. Additionally she demanded an apology from senior PPDB figures.

Appearing on the BNT show, Panorama, Gabriel defended her decision to return the first mandate completed by referencing the need for a stable government and confirmed that the main disagreements between PPDB and GERB were relatively minor.

On 24 March, in an emergency press briefing, Gabriel confirmed that attempts at renewed negotiations had ended in failure due to "new demands" presented by PP–DB, such as the removal of the incumbent Minister of Interior, Kalin Stoyanov. Subsequently, Gabriel announced she would be withdrawing her candidacy for Prime Minister, which was approved by the National Assembly on the 26th of March.

=== European People's Party ===
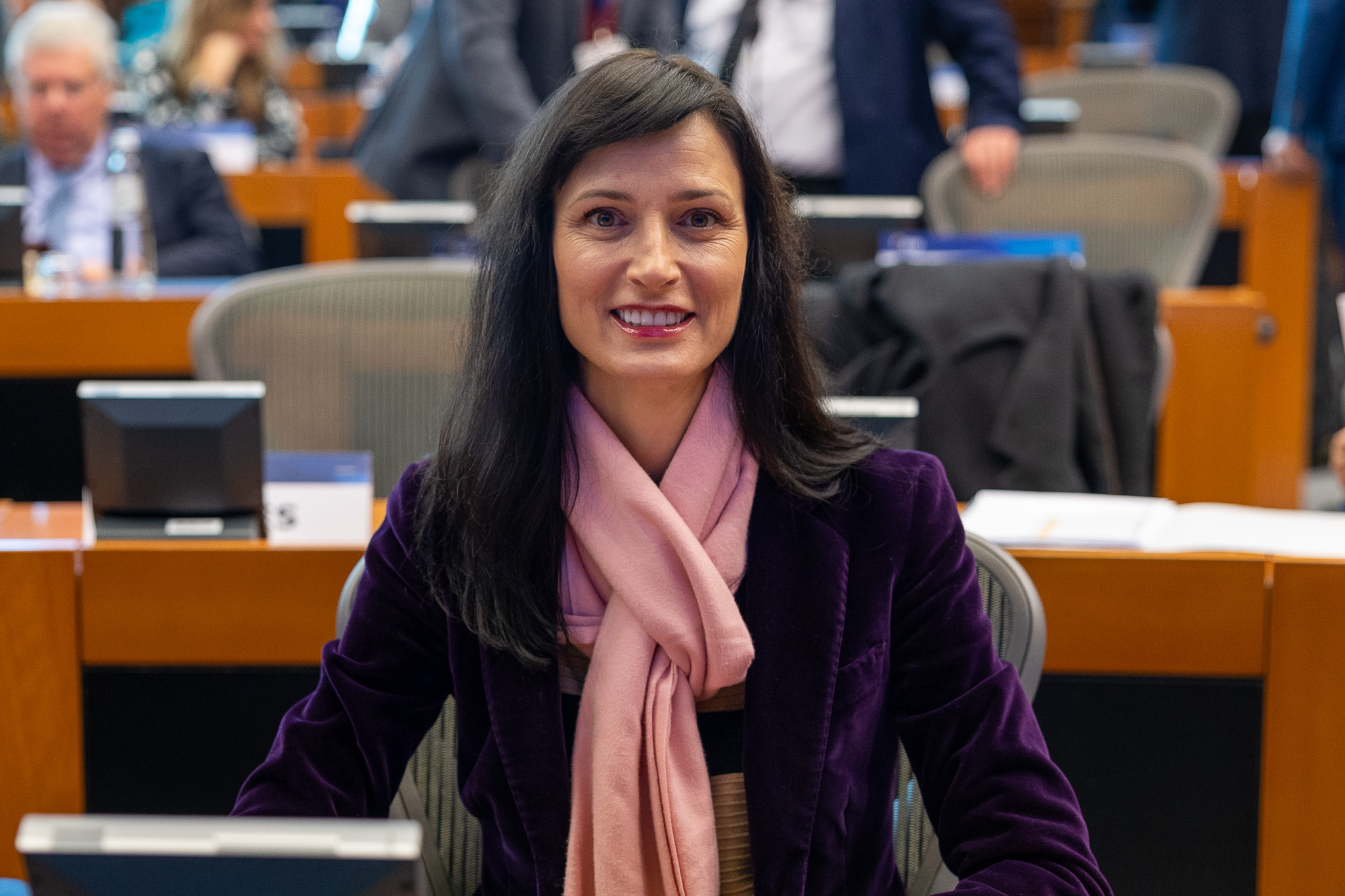
Gabriel during the EPP Political Assembly in January 2025

After her resignation from Bulgarian politics in 2024, Gabriel was unsuccessfully nominated as vice president of the European People’s Party and deputy secretary-general of NATO. She then became the European People’s Party women president in December 2025 and president of the Robert Schuman Institute, a Budapest-based training institute affiliated with the party.

=== UNESCO ===
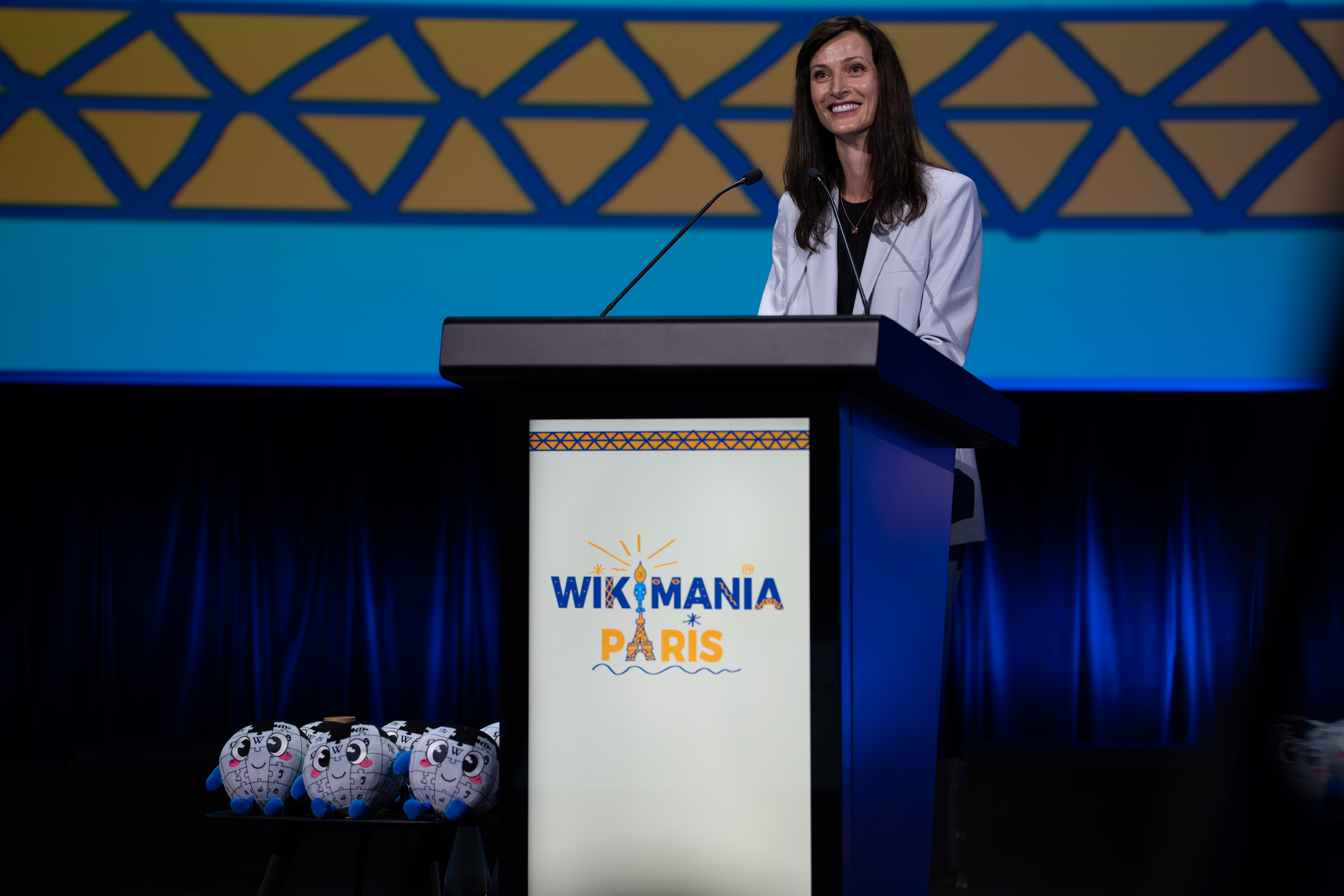
Gabriel addressing the opening ceremony of Wikimania in July 2026.

In early 2026, Gabriel was named as a strong contender for the post of UNESCO's assistant director general for information and communication. She was supported by the Bulgarian government, with the then-outgoing Bulgarian foreign minister Georg Georgiev signing a letter in favor of her nomination on 23 January 2026. Bulgaria's permanent delegate to UNESCO, Radka Balabanova-Ruleva, who was appointed during Gabriel's earlier term as foreign minister, was responsible for securing her nomination through various channels, including talks with the-then newly appointed UNESCO director-general Khaled El-Enany. Her appointment was formally announced by UNESCO a week later on 30 January, and she took office on 1 March 2026. On 15 July 2026, Gabriel signed an agreement made by the permanent delegate of the Netherlands to UNESCO, which pledged a four-year contribution of €2.4 million over four years to UNESCO’s Communication and Information Sector.

== Controversies ==
In 2017, in the midst of her candidacy as EU commissioner, Bulgarian reporters discovered that she was renting a plush apartment from the municipality in the upscale Lozenets district of Sofia for just €200 a month — about a quarter of the market rate. Bulgaria's anti-corruption commission (the Commission for Countering Corruption and Forfeiture of Illegally Acquired Property) was tipped off that Gabriel rented a municipal housing in October 2010 while she was a MEP. The difference between the market rental price of about €800 on average and the rent paid by Gabriel for 32 months, amounts to nearly €20,000. The commission indeed found a signed rental agreement from 1 October 2010 to 11 April 2012.

The deal was allegedly brokered by the center-right GERB party, which controls the Sofia Municipality and owns the apartment. Gabriel failed to disclose the discount in her declaration of interests in 2012 and 2014, which she was required to complete as a Member of the European Parliament (MEP). The preferential rental agreement was also missing from the declaration of financial interests she submitted for the job as head of the European Commission's digital economy and society portfolio. Three cabinet ministers resigned in 2019 with similar accusations.

== Personal life ==
She is married to François Gabriel. The couple has one child.

== Prizes and awards ==
- 2013 'MEP of the year' Award in the 'Gender Equality category;
- 2015 Award of The European Association of Communications Agencies for her achievements in relations to gender equality and women's rights;
- 2016 "MEP of the year" Award in the Development category;
- 2016 Order of San Carlos from the Government of Colombia for outstanding contribution to the nation of Colombia in the area of international relations and diplomacy;

Political offices
Preceded by Kristalina Georgieva	Bulgarian European Commissioner; 2017–2023	Succeeded by Iliana Ivanova
Preceded by Andrus Ansip; Acting	European Commissioner for Digital Economy and Society; 2017–2019	Succeeded by Margrethe Vestager as Executive Vice President of the European Commission for A Europe Fit for the Digital Age
Preceded by Tibor Navracsics as European Commissioner for Education, Culture, Youth and Sport	European Commissioner for Innovation, Research, Culture, Education and Youth; 2019–2023	Succeeded by Margaritis Schinas; Acting as European Commissioner for Culture, Education and Youth
Preceded by Tibor Navracsics as European Commissioner for Education, Culture, Youth and Sport	European Commissioner for Innovation, Research, Culture, Education and Youth; 2019–2023	Succeeded by Margrethe Vestager; Acting as European Commissioner for Innovation and Research
Preceded by Ivan Kondov	Minister of Foreign Affairs; 2023–2024	Succeeded by Stefan Dimitrov
