= Bernhard Knoll =

Austrian diplomat and professor

Bernhard Knoll-Tudor
- Education: Johns Hopkins University / School of Advanced International Studies (SAIS), M.A. 1998; European University Institute, Florence (Ph.D., 2006)
- Occupations: Adjunct Faculty for Public International Law at the Hertie School, Berlin
- Known for: Work with OSCE and UNMIK
- Notable work: The Legal Status of Territories Subject to Administration by International Organisations, Cambridge University Press, 2008)

Bernhard Knoll-Tudor, often referred to as Bernhard Knoll, is adjunct professor of public international law at the Hertie School in Berlin, and directs its Executive Education Department. He is interested in the Organization for Security and Co-operation in Europe (OSCE) and its activities, and was a member of the United Nations Interim Administration Mission in Kosovo (UNMIK).

== Biography ==
Prior to 2006, Knoll was involved in the OSCE Mission to Bosnia and then the OSCE Mission to Kosovo from 2000 to 2002. He then worked with UNMIK.

In 2006, Knoll served as a Special Advisor to the Director of the OSCE Office for Democratic Institutions and Human Rights (ODIHR), where he was an elections monitor in 2007. He also advised Janez Lenarcic when the latter became the incoming Director of the ODIHR in 2008.

Knoll's 2008 doctoral thesis, published by Cambridge University Press, attracted scholarly attention.

In March 2009, Knoll noted the significance of neither the SRSG nor the United Nations Security Council pronouncing Kosovo's declaration of independence a violation of Resolution 1244.

Knoll was an OSCE elections monitor at the 2012 Russian Federation elections.

In January 2013, Knoll became an academic at the Central European University in Budapest, where he directed the Global Policy Academy.

Knoll was mentioned as a historian in the final report of UNMIK, and was cited extensively in many papers on the subject of UNMIK.

In November and December 2020, Knoll wrote about the role of the European Union in post-war Karabakh. He also wrote in February 2021 about a possible role for the OSCE there.

== Bibliography ==
- Knoll, Bernhard (2005). "From Benchmarking to Final Status? Kosovo and the Problem of an International Administration's Open-Ended Mandate". European Journal of International Law. 16 (4): 637–660. doi:10.1093/ejil/chi140.
- Knoll, Bernhard (2006). "Legitimacy through defiance: The UN and local institutions in Kosovo". Helsinki Monitor. 17 (4): 313–326. doi:10.1163/157181406778917323.
- Knoll, Bernhard; Uhl, Robert-Jan (2007). "Too Little, Too Late: the Human Rights Advisory Panel in Kosovo". European Human Rights Law Review. 7: 534–549.
- Knoll, Bernhard; Manton, E. (2007). "Monitoring within the OSCE Office for Democratic Institutions and Human Rights". In Alfredsson, Gudmundur; Grimheden, Jonas; Ramcharan, Bertrand G.; Zayas, Alfred (eds.). International Human Rights Monitoring Mechanisms: Essays in Honour of Jakob Th. Möller (2nd ed.). Martinus Nijhoff. hdl:1814/7306.
- Knoll, Bernhard (2008). "Kosovo's Status Process and the Prospect of Sovereignty". OSCE Yearbook: 121–160. hdl:1814/12755.
- Knoll, Bernhard (2008). "Kosovo: Statusprozess und Ausblick auf die staatliche Souveränität". OSCE Core Year Book.
- Legal Status of Territories Subject to Administration of International Organisations. Cambridge University Press. 2008.
- Knoll, Bernhard (2008). The Legal Status of Territories Subject to Administration by International Organisations. doi:10.1017/CBO9780511494383. ISBN 9780521885836.
- Knoll, Bernhard (2008). "Rights Without Remedies: The European Court's Failure to Close the Human Rights Gap in Kosovo" (PDF). ZaöRV. 68: 431–451.
- Snoy, Bernard (April 2009). "The OSCE: A Commitment to Human Rights". 60 Years of the Universal Declaration of Human Rights in Europe. Vol. 17. pp. 291–294. doi:10.1163/157181406778917279.
- Eschenbächer, Jens-Hagen; Knoll, Bernhard (2011). Observing Elections in 'Long-Standing Democracies': Added Value or Waste of Money? (PDF). OSCE Yearbook 2010. Nomos. p. 263.
- Tagwerker, Nathalie; Diaz-Plaja, Ruben-Eric; Knoll, Bernhard (2012). "The OSCE and the Middle East and North African Region: Not So Fast?". Security and Human Rights. 23 (3): 191–197. doi:10.1163/18750230-99900016.
