= Von der Leyen Commission I =

European Commission from 2019 to 2024

- 7th Commission of the European Union

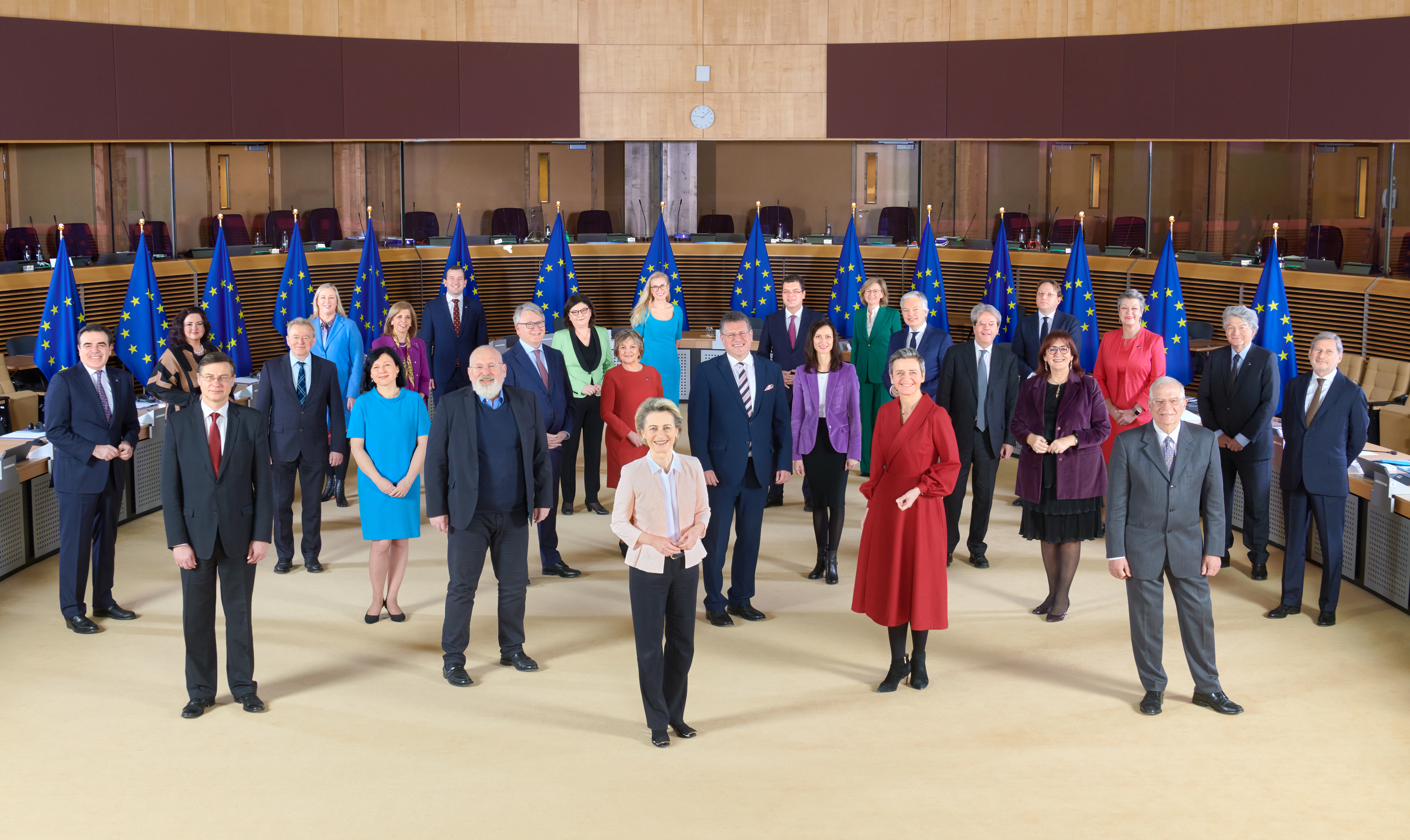
- The College of Commissioners in 2021
- Date formed: 1 December 2019
- Date dissolved: 30 November 2024

People and organisations
- President of the Commission: Ursula von der Leyen (EPP, GER)
- Vice-President(s) of the Commission: First Vice President: Maroš Šefčovič (PES, SVK); Other Executive Vice Presidents: Margrethe Vestager (ALDE, DEN); Valdis Dombrovskis (EPP, LAT)
- No. of commissioners: 27
- Member parties: EPP (11); PES (8); ALDE Party (6); ECR Party (1); EGP (1)
- Status in legislature: 421 / 705 (60%); Informal Coalition (421): EPP Group (175); S&D (144); Renew (102)

History
- Election(s): 2019 European Parliament election
- Legislature term(s): Ninth
- Budget(s): €165.8 billion (2019)
- Predecessor: Juncker Commission
- Successor: von der Leyen Commission II

The first von der Leyen Commission was the European Commission in office from 1 December 2019 to 30 November 2024. It consisted of one commissioner from each of the member states of the European Union – including Ursula von der Leyen, its president, who is from Germany.

The commission was scheduled to take office on 1 November 2019; however, the French, Hungarian and Romanian commissioner-candidates lost their confirmation votes by the European Parliament in early October 2019, so new commissioners had to be selected from those three member states by the President-elect and subsequently confirmed by the Parliament. This process took place in November 2019 and the Commission eventually took office in its entirety on 1 December 2019.

== Election ==
=== President ===
Following the example of the 2014 European Election, in advance of the 2019 elections the main European political parties named so-called spitzenkandidaten, or leading candidates, who were the parties' candidates to become the next president of the European Commission. All of the parties named at least one candidate; some named two, while the Alliance of Liberals and Democrats for Europe Party (ALDE), which officially opposed the system of spitzenkandidaten, introduced "Team Europe," which consisted of several high-ranking European politicians. However, other parties perceived those candidates, especially Margrethe Vestager of Denmark, as leading candidates.

After winning 2019 European election, the European People's Party claimed that the position of the President of the European Commission should be given to them and wanted their leading candidate Manfred Weber for the job. However, Weber faced strong opposition from the liberal-leaning French President Emmanuel Macron and the ALDE, and from the Party of European Socialists (PES) as well; opposition was driven by Weber's lack of experience, since he had only previously served as MEP and never held any governmental position. The PES strongly supported the candidature of Frans Timmermans, who also had support from most of the ALDE members of the European Council. (Andrej Babiš, then Czech Prime Minister, is a member of the ALDE but also of the Visegrad Four, which strongly opposed Timmermans because of his support for migration quotas and inability to reach compromises.) The ALDE Party wanted to see Margrethe Vestager taking the top Commission job.

The first European Council meeting was held on 20 and 21 June 2019, bringing no decision on distribution of EU top jobs. President Donald Tusk summoned leaders again for a special meeting that lasted from 30 June until 2 July 2019. Over three days of negotiations, the EPP gave up on Weber becoming the President of the commission; it seemed that Timmermans might be nominated, especially after he met with Bulgarian Prime Minister and EPP member Boyko Borisov at the Bulgarian Embassy in Belgium during the meeting of the European Council. Naming Timmermans President of the European Commission would have been a part of the so-called Osaka deal, a plan that was formed by several EU leaders (Emmanuel Macron, Angela Merkel, Giuseppe Conte, Donald Tusk, Mark Rutte, and Pedro Sánchez) during the 2019 G20 Summit in Osaka, Japan.

However, the opposition from Visegrad Four, now joined by Croatia and Italy, was still strong, and Timmermans could not win a Council majority. Other names mentioned during the negotiations included Michel Barnier, Kristalina Georgieva and Andrej Plenković; it became clear after the Council ended that Plenković's name had been introduced by Commission Secretary-General Martin Selmayr, who is Plenković's close friend. The candidature was rejected by Macron, who opposed the personal ambitions of leaders.

When Ursula von der Leyen (EPP)'s name emerged as a potential candidate, it was a surprise and she faced many critics, mainly because she had not been a spitzenkandidat. The German Social Democratic Party, part of the German government coalition, opposed von der Leyen due to her work as minister of defence, which resulted in the German Chancellor Angela Merkel's abstention during the council's vote on the proposal. Nevertheless, all other European Council members voted in favor, and she was nominated as the next President of the European Commission. Von der Leyen, a member of the European People's Party (EPP), was selected and proposed to the European Parliament by the European Council on 3 July 2019 following three days of negotiations between leaders of the member states. Von der Leyen faced many critics, especially among MEPs, since the European Council ignored the so-called spitzenkandidat system when choosing her for the position.

On 16 July 2019, the European Parliament took a vote on the proposal by the European Council and elected Von der Leyen with 383 votes (374 votes needed). Before the vote, Von der Leyen had received the support of three largest political groups in the Parliament (EPP, S&D and RE); during the debate the conservative Polish party Law and Justice with 24 MEPs and the Italian Five Stars Movement (M5S) with 14 MEPs declared their support. Based on the result of the vote, nearly 100 MEPs of the unofficial grand coalition EPP-S&D-RE did not vote for Von der Leyen. Based on the debate and public announcements of the MEPs, most of the MEPs voting against von der Leyen probably came from the S&D group, including the German Social Democratic Party, which publicly opposed Von der Leyen because of her work as German Defence Minister.

Required majority 374 out of 747	Public voting indication (individual votes unknown, as the ballot was secret)							
Required majority 374 out of 747	GUE/NGL	S&D	G/EFA	RE	EPP	ECR	ID	NI
Yes 383 / 747		73 or more: (Spain) PSOE (20); (Italy) PD (19); (Portugal) PS (9); (Poland) SLD (5); (Sweden) S (5); (Malta) PL (4); (Poland) Wiosna (3); (Denmark) S (3); (Slovakia) Smer–SD (3); (Finland) SDE (2)		108 or less • (European Union) ALDE (108)	182 or less: (European Union) EPP (182); (Hungary) Fidesz-KDNP (13); (Poland) PO (14); (Italy) FI (6); (Poland) PSL (3); (Italy) SVP (1)	26 or more • (Poland) PiS-SP (26)		14 or more • (Italy) M5S (14)
No 327 / 747	41 or less • (European Union) GUE/NGL	42 or more: (Germany) SPD (16); (Netherlands) PvdA (6); (France) PS-PP-ND (5); (Austria) SPÖ (5); (Bulgaria) BSP (5); (Belgium) PS (2); (Belgium) sp.a (1); (Slovenia) SD (2)	74 or less: (European Union) Greens/EFA; (Austria) GRÜNE (2); (Germany) Volt (1)	9 or more: (Denmark) V (3); (Germany) FW (2); (Netherlands) D66 (2); (Austria) NEOS (1); (Latvia) AP! (1)		5 or more: (Italy) FdI (5)	42 or more: (Italy) Lega (28); (Germany) AfD (11); (Austria) FPÖ (3)	29 or more • (United Kingdom) Brexit (29)
Abstentions 23 / 747								
Absentees 14 / 747								
Total : 747	41	153	74	108	182	62	73	54

Le Grand Continent published a detailed analysis of the secret ballot. The authors numbered the public pledges of national delegations and individual MEPs as amounting to 410, which is 27 more than what von der Leyen ultimately received. To explain the difference, they suggested three scenarios: one in which the support of delegations from the S&D group (some for, some against, some equivocal) was lower than admitted, another in which MEPs from the populist parties in government (Poland's PiS, Hungary's Fidesz and Italy's M5S) were claiming support only to gain leverage, and a half-way scenario which they see as the likeliest. In two of these three scenarios, the S&D group, which for decades was the pillar of the Grand coalition in Europe, no longer has a majority of MEPs supporting the Commission.

=== Commission ===
Even before Von der Leyen's confirmation, she pledged to renominate Frans Timmermans, the spitzenkandidat of the Party of European Socialists as the First Vice President. Margrethe Vestager, one of the leading candidates of the Alliance of Liberal and Democrats for Europe Party (ALDE), was chosen as vice president as well, having de facto equal position to that of Timmermans.

Von der Leyen requested that member states each propose two candidates, a man and a woman, so it would be easier to form a gender-balanced commission. France's Thierry Breton was the last candidate to be designated on 24 October 2019 by Emmanuel Macron.

Following her election, President of the European Council Donald Tusk asked von der Leyen to give her consent on appointing Josep Borrell of Spain as the next EU High Representative. Consent was given on 26 July 2019, following which the European Council officially appointed Borrell as the next High Representative of the Union for Foreign Affairs and Security Policy on 5 August 2019.

The commission was approved by the European Parliament on 27 November 2019, receiving 461 votes, with 157 against and 89 abstentions. EPP, S&D, Renew Europe and half of the ECR voted in favour. The Greens/EFA abstained.

Commission	Votes cast	Majority	In favour	Against	Abstain	Source
Von der Leyen Commission	707	374	461	157	89	

==== Commissioners-designate ====
The responsible committee held a 3-hour hearing of the Commissioner-designate to examine the candidate's competence and suitability. Committee decided if candidate is suitable to become a European Commissioner and if their knowledge of the portfolio is sufficient. After each hearing, the committee voted on the candidate. Decisions of the committee were first taken by the coordinators of the EP political groups, at this point each candidate needed support of 2/3 of coordinators, if support was reached, the candidate was confirmed. If such support was not reached, then committee as a whole took a vote on a Commissioner-designate, where a candidate needed the support of the majority of committee members. If candidate was rejected by the committee as well, President-elect could propose a new candidate, in which case a new hearing would take place for a new candidate. Coordinators could also decide to hold additional hearing of 1.5 hours or demand additional written answers. If there were more committees hearing one candidate, all committees would give a joint evaluation.

The first round of hearings took place from 30 September until 8 October 2019, followed by the evaluation by the BCPR (Conference of Presidents) on 15 October 2019. If any of the candidates would be rejected by the responsible committee, new hearings would take place on 14 and 15 October 2019, followed by BCPR evaluation on 16 October 2019. BCPR closed hearings process on 17 October 2019. Before the hearings begin, Committee on Legal Affairs, on 19 September 2019, examined if there was a possibility of a conflict of interests for any of the candidates for commissioners.

The United Kingdom, which had been expected to leave the EU on 31 October 2019, did not nominate a candidate for commissioner.

It was reported by Euractiv on 26 September 2019 that commissioners-designate László Trócsányi of Hungary (Neighbourhood and Enlargement) and Rovana Plumb of Romania (Transport) will be questioned by the European Parliament Legal Affairs Committee about their declarations of interests due to potential conflict of interests and "discrepancies in property statements". Other commissioners-designate were approved by the committee, including Didier Reynders of Belgium (Justice) and Sylvie Goulard of France (Internal Market) who are under investigation by respective national authorities due to corruption allegations or misuse of EU money, according to one of the MEPs because the Committee does not have the authority to question candidates beyond facts stated in the declarations od interests. Euractiv also reports that Janusz Wojciechowski of Poland (Agriculture) might as well be questioned by the committee. Euractiv reported later that day that Rovana Plumb of Romania was rejected as a European Commissioner-designate by 10 votes to 6 (with 2 abstentions). Hungarian Commissioner-designate László Trócsányi was rejected on 26 September as well by 11 votes to 9 due to his personal finances in connection with his law firm, he founded before becoming Minister of Justice and due to concerns about "connections to Russia" in relation to extradition of Russian suspects to Russia. It is up to the President-elect Ursula von der Leyen to take further decisions on candidates, while JURI approval is a necessary precondition for hearings to take place. This was the first time that candidates have been rejected by the JURI Committee.

Following the JURI Committee decision to reject László Trócsányi, he published a statement on his Twitter account later that day, stating that he will take all legal steps against the decision. This could have an impact on the process of formation of the new European Commission which is due to take office on 1 November 2019.

The Legal Affairs Committee was asked to decide on both rejected candidates again and on 30 September 2019 JURI again rejected both of the candidates, Plumb with 13 votes to 7 and Trócsányi with 12 votes to 9. Following the vote, President-elect Von der Leyen asked the national governments of Romania and Hungary to propose new candidates. Hungary already proposed a new candidate Olivér Várhelyi, its Permanent Representative to the EU.

According to several media reports hearings before the European Parliament committees could be tough for:

- Janusz Wojciechowski - European Commissioner-designate for Agriculture (due to ongoing investigation by OLAF regarding irregularities in the reimbursement of travel expenses when he was MEP; it was reported on 27 September by Politico that OLAF dropped investigation because Wojciechowski already paid the money back to the European Parliament)
- Didier Reynders - European Commissioner-designate for Justice (due to investigation by the national authorities regarding corruption and money laundering in the Democratic Republic of Congo; it was reported by Politico on 27 September 2019 that Belgian prosecutor dropped the investigation against Reynders and found no wrongdoing)
- Sylvie Goulard - European Commissioner-designate for Internal Market (due to alleged misuse of EU funds)
- Paolo Gentiloni - European Commissioner-designate for Economy (due to his role in Italian economy as Prime Minister)
- Dubravka Šuica - Vice-President-designate for Democracy and Demography (due to personal finances and possession of many real estate worth more than 5 million euros in light of her work as teacher, mayor and MP, and due to her views on women's rights, especially freedom of birth and due to her past votings as MEP where she objected abortion)

===== Schedule of the hearings =====
Date	9:00-12:00	14:30-17:30	18:30-21:30
30 September 2019		Maroš Šefčovič of Slovakia; Vice-President-designate for Inter-Institutional Relations and Foresight	Phil Hogan of Ireland; European Commissioner-designate for Trade
30 September 2019		AFCO / JURI / PETI / ITRE	INTA
30 September 2019			Mariya Gabriel of Bulgaria; European Commissioner-designate for Innivation and Youth
30 September 2019			ITRE / CULT
1 October 2019	Nicolas Schmit of Luxembourg; European Commissioner-designate for Jobs	Janusz Wojciechowski of Poland; European Commissioner-designate for Agriculture; HEARING NO. 1	László Trócsányi of Hungary; European Commissioner-designate for Neighbourhood and Enlargement; NO HEARING HELD
1 October 2019	EMPL / ECON	AGRI / ENVI	AFET
1 October 2019	Jutta Urpilainen of Finland; European Commissioner-designate for International Partnerships	Ylva Johansson of Sweden; European Commissioner-designate for Home Affairs	Stella Kyriakidou of Cyprus; European Commissioner-designate for Health
1 October 2019	DEVE	LIBE	ENVI / AGRI
2 October 2019	Didier Reynders of Belgium; European Commissioner-designate for Justice	Helena Dalli of Malta; European Commissioner-designate for Equality	Elisa Ferreira of Portugal; European Commissioner-designate for Cohesion and Reforms
2 October 2019	LIBE / JURI / IMCO	FEMM / EMPL / LIBE	REGI / BUDG / ECON
2 October 2019	Rovana Plumb of Romania; European Commissioner-designate for Transport; NO HEARING HELD	Sylvie Goulard of France; European Commissioner-designate for Internal Market; HEARING NO. 1	Janez Lenarčič of Slovenia; European Commissioner-designate for Crisis Management
2 October 2019	TRAN / ENVI	IMCO / ITRE / JURI / CULT	DEVE / ENVI
3 October 2019	Paolo Gentiloni of Italy; European Commissioner-designate for Economy	Virginijus Sinkevičius of Lithuania; European Commissioner-designate for Environment and Oceans	Margaritis Schinas of Greece; Vice-President-designate for Protecting our European Way of Life
3 October 2019	ECON / BUDG / EMPL	PECH / ENVI	LIBE / CULT / EMPL
3 October 2019	Kadri Simson of Estonia; European Commissioner-designate for Energy	Johannes Hahn of Austria; European Commissioner-designate for Budget and Administration	Dubravka Šuica of Croatia; Vice-President-designate for Democracy and Demography
3 October 2019	ITRE / ENVI	BUDG / CONT / JURI	AFCO / EMPL
7 October 2019		Věra Jourová of the Czech Republic; Vice-President-designate for Values and Transparency	
7 October 2019		AFCO / LIBE / JURI	
7 October 2019		Josep Borrell of Spain; Vice-President-designate for A Stronger Europe in the World and High Representative of the Union for Foreign Affairs and Security Policy	
7 October 2019		AFET	
8 October 2019	Valdis Dombrovskis of Latvia; Executive Vice-President-designate for Economy that Works for People and European Commissioner-designate for Financial Markets	Margrethe Vestager of Denmark; Executive Vice-President-designate for Europe Fit for Digital Age and European Commissioner-designate for Competition	Frans Timmermans of the Netherlands; Executive Vice-President-designate for the European Green Deal and European Commissioner-designate for Climate Action
8 October 2019	ECON / EMPL / BUDG	ITRE / IMCO / ECON / JURI	ENVI / ITRE / TRAN
8 October 2019	Janusz Wojciechowski of Poland; European Commissioner-designate for Agriculture; HEARING NO. 2		
8 October 2019	AGRI / ENVI		
10 October 2019	Sylvie Goulard of France; European Commissioner-designate for Internal Market; HEARING NO. 2		
10 October 2019	IMCO / ITRE / JURI / CULT		
Source: Confirmed candidate Candidate with additional hearing Rejected candidate Responsible Committee Associated Committee

Coordinators of political groups in the responsible committees decided that additional written answers will be requested by and potentially additional hearing of 1.5 hours should be held for:

- Janusz Wojciechowski of Poland, European Commissioner-designate for Agriculture (additional hearing on 8 October 2019)
- Sylvie Goulard of France, European Commissioner-designate for Internal Market (additional hearing on 10 October 2019)
- Ylva Johansson of Sweden, European Commissioner-designate for Home Affairs

===== Hearings =====
Candidate			Official nomination	Portfolio	Committee vote					Ref.
Candidate			Official nomination	Portfolio	Date	Committee	In favor	Against	Abstain	Ref.
EPP	Johannes Hahn	AUT	22 July 2019	Budget and Administration	3 October 2019	BUDG	Confirmed by the Coordinators no Committee vote			
EPP	Johannes Hahn	AUT	22 July 2019	Budget and Administration	3 October 2019	CONT	Confirmed by the Coordinators no Committee vote			
EPP	Johannes Hahn	AUT	22 July 2019	Budget and Administration	3 October 2019	JURI	Confirmed by the Coordinators no Committee vote			
ALDE	Didier Reynders	BEL		Justice	2 October 2019	LIBE	Confirmed by the Coordinators no Committee vote			
ALDE	Didier Reynders	BEL		Justice	2 October 2019	JURI	Confirmed by the Coordinators no Committee vote			
ALDE	Didier Reynders	BEL		Justice	2 October 2019	IMCO	Confirmed by the Coordinators no Committee vote			
EPP	Mariya Gabriel	BUL	23 July 2019	Innovation and Youth	30 September 2019	CULT	Confirmed by the Coordinators no Committee vote			
EPP	Mariya Gabriel	BUL	23 July 2019	Innovation and Youth	30 September 2019	ITRE	Confirmed by the Coordinators no Committee vote			
EPP	Dubravka Šuica	CRO	22 August 2019	Democracy and Demography (Vice President)	3 October 2019	AFCO	Confirmed by the Coordinators no Committee vote			
EPP	Dubravka Šuica	CRO	22 August 2019	Democracy and Demography (Vice President)	3 October 2019	EMPL	Confirmed by the Coordinators no Committee vote			
EPP	Stella Kyriakidou	CYP	23 July 2019	Health	1 October 2019	ENVI	Confirmed by the Coordinators no Committee vote			
EPP	Stella Kyriakidou	CYP	23 July 2019	Health	1 October 2019	AGRI	Confirmed by the Coordinators no Committee vote			
ALDE	Věra Jourová	CZE	26 August 2019	Values and Transparency (Vice President)	7 October 2019	LIBE	Confirmed by the Coordinators no Committee vote			
ALDE	Věra Jourová	CZE	26 August 2019	Values and Transparency (Vice President)	7 October 2019	AFCO	Confirmed by the Coordinators no Committee vote			
ALDE	Věra Jourová	CZE	26 August 2019	Values and Transparency (Vice President)	7 October 2019	JURI	Confirmed by the Coordinators no Committee vote			
ALDE	Margrethe Vestager	DEN	1 August 2019	A Europe Fit for the Digital Age (Executive Vice President)	8 October 2019	ECON	Confirmed by the Coordinators no Committee vote			
ALDE	Margrethe Vestager	DEN	1 August 2019	A Europe Fit for the Digital Age (Executive Vice President)	8 October 2019	ITRE	Confirmed by the Coordinators no Committee vote			
ALDE	Margrethe Vestager	DEN	1 August 2019	A Europe Fit for the Digital Age (Executive Vice President)	8 October 2019	IMCO	Confirmed by the Coordinators no Committee vote			
ALDE	Margrethe Vestager	DEN	1 August 2019	A Europe Fit for the Digital Age (Executive Vice President)	8 October 2019	JURI	Confirmed by the Coordinators no Committee vote			
ALDE	Kadri Simson	EST	22 July 2019	Energy	3 October 2019	ITRE	Confirmed by the Coordinators no Committee vote			
ALDE	Kadri Simson	EST	22 July 2019	Energy	3 October 2019	ENVI	Confirmed by the Coordinators no Committee vote			
PES	Jutta Urpilainen	FIN	22 July 2019	International Partnerships	1 October 2019	DEVE	Confirmed by the Coordinators no Committee vote			
Ind.	Thierry Breton	FRA		Internal Market		IMCO				
Ind.	Thierry Breton	FRA		Internal Market		ITRE				
Ind.	Thierry Breton	FRA		Internal Market		JURI				
Ind.	Thierry Breton	FRA		Internal Market		CULT				
EPP	Margaritis Schinas	GRE	23 July 2019	Promoting the European Way of Life (Vice President)	3 October 2019	LIBE	Confirmed by the Coordinators no Committee vote			
EPP	Margaritis Schinas	GRE	23 July 2019	Promoting the European Way of Life (Vice President)	3 October 2019	CULT	Confirmed by the Coordinators no Committee vote			
EPP	Margaritis Schinas	GRE	23 July 2019	Promoting the European Way of Life (Vice President)	3 October 2019	EMPL	Confirmed by the Coordinators no Committee vote			
EPP	Olivér Várhelyi	HUN	1 October 2019	Neighbourhood and Enlargement		AFET				
EPP	Phil Hogan	IRL	31 July 2019	Trade	30 September 2019	INTA	Confirmed by the Coordinators no Committee vote			
PES	Paolo Gentiloni	ITA	6 September 2019	Economy	3 October 2019	ECON	Confirmed by the Coordinators no Committee vote			
PES	Paolo Gentiloni	ITA	6 September 2019	Economy	3 October 2019	BUDG	Confirmed by the Coordinators no Committee vote			
PES	Paolo Gentiloni	ITA	6 September 2019	Economy	3 October 2019	EMPL	Confirmed by the Coordinators no Committee vote			
EPP	Valdis Dombrovskis	LAT	23 July 2019	An Economy that Works for People (Executive Vice President)	8 October 2019	ECON	Confirmed by the Coordinators no Committee vote			
EPP	Valdis Dombrovskis	LAT	23 July 2019	An Economy that Works for People (Executive Vice President)	8 October 2019	EMPL	Confirmed by the Coordinators no Committee vote			
EPP	Valdis Dombrovskis	LAT	23 July 2019	An Economy that Works for People (Executive Vice President)	8 October 2019	BUDG	Confirmed by the Coordinators no Committee vote			
Ind.	Virginijus Sinkevičius	LIT	28 August 2019	Environment, Oceans and Fisheries	3 October 2019	ENVI	Confirmed by the Coordinators no Committee vote			
Ind.	Virginijus Sinkevičius	LIT	28 August 2019	Environment, Oceans and Fisheries	3 October 2019	PECH	Confirmed by the Coordinators no Committee vote			
PES	Nicolas Schmit	LUX		Jobs and Social Rights	1 October 2019	EMPL	Confirmed by the Coordinators no Committee vote			
PES	Nicolas Schmit	LUX		Jobs and Social Rights	1 October 2019	ECON	Confirmed by the Coordinators no Committee vote			
PES	Helena Dalli	MLT	31 July 2019	Equality	2 October 2019	FEMM	Confirmed by the Coordinators no Committee vote			
PES	Helena Dalli	MLT	31 July 2019	Equality	2 October 2019	EMPL	Confirmed by the Coordinators no Committee vote			
PES	Helena Dalli	MLT	31 July 2019	Equality	2 October 2019	LIBE	Confirmed by the Coordinators no Committee vote			
PES	Frans Timmermans	NED	24 July 2019	European Green Deal (Executive Vice President)	8 October 2019	ENVI	Confirmed by the Coordinators no Committee vote			
PES	Frans Timmermans	NED	24 July 2019	European Green Deal (Executive Vice President)	8 October 2019	ITRE	Confirmed by the Coordinators no Committee vote			
PES	Frans Timmermans	NED	24 July 2019	European Green Deal (Executive Vice President)	8 October 2019	TRAN	Confirmed by the Coordinators no Committee vote			
ECR	Janusz Wojciechowski	POL	2 September 2019	Agriculture	10 October 2019	AGRI	Confirmed by the Coordinators no Committee vote			
ECR	Janusz Wojciechowski	POL	2 September 2019	Agriculture	10 October 2019	ENVI	Confirmed by the Coordinators no Committee vote			
PES	Elisa Ferreira	POR	26 August 2019	Cohesion and Reforms	2 October 2019	REGI	Confirmed by the Coordinators no Committee vote			
PES	Elisa Ferreira	POR	26 August 2019	Cohesion and Reforms	2 October 2019	BUDG	Confirmed by the Coordinators no Committee vote			
PES	Elisa Ferreira	POR	26 August 2019	Cohesion and Reforms	2 October 2019	ECON	Confirmed by the Coordinators no Committee vote			
PES	Adina-Ioana Vălean	ROM	7 October 2019	Transport		TRAN				
PES	Adina-Ioana Vălean	ROM	7 October 2019	Transport		ENVI				
PES	Maroš Šefčovič	SVK	19 July 2019	Interinstitutional Relations and Foresight (Vice President)	30 September 2019	AFCO	Confirmed by the Coordinators no Committee vote			
PES	Maroš Šefčovič	SVK	19 July 2019	Interinstitutional Relations and Foresight (Vice President)	30 September 2019	JURI	Confirmed by the Coordinators no Committee vote			
PES	Maroš Šefčovič	SVK	19 July 2019	Interinstitutional Relations and Foresight (Vice President)	30 September 2019	PETI	Confirmed by the Coordinators no Committee vote			
PES	Maroš Šefčovič	SVK	19 July 2019	Interinstitutional Relations and Foresight (Vice President)	30 September 2019	ITRE	Confirmed by the Coordinators no Committee vote			
ALDE	Janez Lenarčič	SLO	26 July 2019	Crisis Management	2 October 2019	DEVE	Confirmed by the Coordinators no Committee vote			
ALDE	Janez Lenarčič	SLO	26 July 2019	Crisis Management	2 October 2019	ENVI	Confirmed by the Coordinators no Committee vote			
PES	Josep Borrell	ESP		Foreign Affairs and Security Policy (Vice President)	7 October 2019	AFET	Confirmed by the Coordinators no Committee vote			
PES	Ylva Johansson	SWE	8 August 2019	Home Affairs	1 October 2019	LIBE	Confirmed by the Coordinators no Committee vote			
Responsible Committee Associated Committee

===== Rejected candidates =====
Candidate			Portfolio	Date	Reason
PES	Rovana Plumb	ROM	Transport	26 September 2019	Rejected by the JURI Committee due to discrepancies in her declarations of interests.
EPP	László Trócsányi	HUN	Neighbourhood and Enlargement	26 September 2019	Rejected by the JURI Committee due to his personal finances in connection with his law firm and possible connections with Russia.
ALDE	Sylvie Goulard	FRA	Internal Market	10 October 2019	Rejected by the responsible committees after the hearing with 82 votes against, 29 in favour and 1 abstention.

== College of Commissioners ==
Von der Leyen Commission
Confirmation by the European Parliament on 27 November 2019 • Appointment by the European Council on 28 November 2019
Portfolio	Designee	Portfolio	Designee	Portfolio	Designee
President	Ursula von der Leyen of Germany (EPP–CDU)	First Vice President and Executive Vice President — European Green Deal; Interinstitutional Relations and Foresight	Maroš Šefčovič of Slovakia (PES–SMER-SD)	Executive Vice President and European Commissioner — Competition	Margrethe Vestager of Denmark (ALDE–B)
Executive Vice President and European Commissioner — Trade	Valdis Dombrovskis of Latvia (EPP–V)	Vice President and High Representative for Foreign Affairs and Security Policy	Josep Borrell of Spain (PES–PSOE)	Vice President and European Commissioner — Promoting the European Way of Life	Margaritis Schinas of Greece (EPP–ND)
Vice President and European Commissioner — Values and Transparency	Věra Jourová of Czech Republic (ALDE–ANO)	Vice President and European Commissioner — Democracy and Demography	Dubravka Šuica of Croatia (EPP–HDZ)	European Commissioner — Climate Action	Wopke Hoekstra of the Netherlands (EPP–CDA)
European Commissioner — Budget	Johannes Hahn of Austria (EPP–ÖVP)	European Commissioner — Innovation, Research, Culture, Education and Youth	Iliana Ivanova of Bulgaria (EPP–GERB)	European Commissioner — Jobs and Social Rights	Nicolas Schmit of Luxembourg (PES–LSAP)
European Commissioner — Economy	Paolo Gentiloni of Italy (PES–PD)	European Commissioner — Agriculture	Janusz Wojciechowski of Poland (ECR–PiS)	European Commissioner — Internal Market	Thierry Breton of France (ALDE–Ind.)
European Commissioner — Cohesion and Reforms	Elisa Ferreira of Portugal (PES–PS)	European Commissioner — Health and Food Safety	Stella Kyriakides of Cyprus (EPP–DISY)	European Commissioner — Justice	Didier Reynders of Belgium (ALDE–MR)
European Commissioner — Equality	Helena Dalli of Malta (PES–PL)	European Commissioner — Home Affairs	Ylva Johansson of Sweden (PES–S)	European Commissioner — Crisis Management	Janez Lenarčič of Slovenia (ALDE–Ind.)
European Commissioner — Transport	Adina Vălean of Romania (EPP–PNL)	European Commissioner — Neighbourhood and Enlargement	Olivér Várhelyi of Hungary (EPP–Ind.)	European Commissioner — International Partnerships	Jutta Urpilainen of Finland (PES–SDP)
European Commissioner — Energy	Kadri Simson of Estonia (Unaffiliated–EK)	European Commissioner — Environment, Oceans and Fisheries	Virginijus Sinkevičius of Lithuania (EGP–LVŽS)	European Commissioner — Financial Stability, Financial Services and the Capital Markets Union	Mairead McGuinness of (Republic of Ireland) Ireland (EPP–FG)

=== Changes ===
- 26 August 2020: Following Golfgate and a controversy about his travels in Ireland in preceding weeks, which conflicted with the Irish COVID-19 guidelines, Trade Commissioner Phil Hogan resigned.
- 12 October 2020: Mairead McGuinness, Ireland's nominee to replace Phil Hogan is confirmed by the European Parliament and appointed as a European Commissioner by the Council of the European Union.
- 15 May 2023: Mariya Gabriel resigns as Commissioner after being tasked with forming the next Bulgarian government.
- 22 August 2023 Frans Timmermans resigns as Executive Vice President for the European Green deal following his selection as a candidate for Prime Minister of the Netherlands in the 2023 Dutch general election.
- 19 September 2023: Iliana Ivanova, Bulgaria's nominee to replace Mariya Gabriel is confirmed by the European Parliament and appointed as a European Commissioner by the Council of the European Union.
- 9 October 2023: Wopke Hoekstra, Netherlands's nominee to replace Frans Timmermans is confirmed by the European Parliament and appointed as a European Commissioner by the Council of the European Union.
- 15 June 2024: Commissioner Adina-Ioana Vălean and Commissioner Virginijus Sinkevičius resigned with effect on 15 and 16 July from the Commission, in order to take up their seat at the European Parliament, to which they have been elected. President von der Leyen decided to temporarily assign the responsibilities for Environment, Ocean and Fisheries to Executive Vice-President Šefčovič, in addition to his current portfolio and to assign the responsibilities for Transport to Commissioner Hoekstra, in addition to his current portfolio.
- 16 September 2024: Commissioner Thierry Breton resigns as Commissioner after accusing Von der Leyen of blocking his renomination to his portfolio in the Second von der Leyen Commission. His responsibilities were temporarily assigned to Margrethe Vestager

=== Group organization ===
Von der Leyen has organized the Commission into groups supervised by the designated executive vice presidents and vice presidents. The members as of 31 May 2024 are below.

Group	Commissioner	Portfolio(s)
European Green Deal	Maroš Šefčovič	European Green Deal (executive vice president); Interinstitutional Relations and Foresight
European Green Deal	Stella Kyriakides	Health and Food Safety
European Green Deal	Adina Vălean	Transport
European Green Deal	Kadri Simson	Energy
European Green Deal	Virginijus Sinkevičius	Environment, Oceans and Fisheries
European Green Deal	Janusz Wojciechowski	Agriculture
European Green Deal	Elisa Ferreira	Cohesion and Reforms
European Green Deal	Wopke Hoekstra	Climate Action
A Europe Fit for the Digital Age	Margrethe Vestager	A Europe Fit for the Digital Age (executive vice president); Competition
A Europe Fit for the Digital Age	Thierry Breton	Internal Market
A Europe Fit for the Digital Age	Nicolas Schmit	Jobs and Social Rights
A Europe Fit for the Digital Age	Didier Reynders	Justice
A Europe Fit for the Digital Age	Iliana Ivanova	Innovation, Research, Culture, Education and Youth
An Economy That Works for People	Valdis Dombrovskis	An Economy That Works for People (executive vice president); Trade
An Economy That Works for People	Nicolas Schmit	Jobs and Social Rights
An Economy That Works for People	Paolo Gentiloni	Economy
An Economy That Works for People	Elisa Ferreira	Cohesion and Reforms
An Economy That Works for People	Mairead McGuinness	Financial Services, Financial Stability and Capital Markets Union
Promoting Our European Way of Life	Margaritis Schinas	Promoting Our European Way of Life (vice president)
Promoting Our European Way of Life	Helena Dalli	Equality
Promoting Our European Way of Life	Ylva Johansson	Home Affairs
Promoting Our European Way of Life	Stella Kyriakides	Health and Food Safety
Promoting Our European Way of Life	Nicolas Schmit	Jobs and Social Rights
Promoting Our European Way of Life	Iliana Ivanova	Innovation, Research, Culture, Education and Youth
A Stronger Europe in the World	Josep Borrell	A Stronger Europe in the World (vice president); High Representative for Foreign Affairs and Security Policy
A Stronger Europe in the World	Olivér Várhelyi	Neighbourhood and Enlargement
A Stronger Europe in the World	Janez Lenarčič	Crisis Management
A Stronger Europe in the World	Jutta Urpilainen	International Partnerships
A New Push for European Democracy	Věra Jourová	Values and Transparency (vice president)
A New Push for European Democracy	Didier Reynders	Justice
A New Push for European Democracy	Maroš Šefčovič	European Green Deal (executive vice president); Interinstitutional Relations and Foresight
A New Push for European Democracy	Dubravka Šuica	Democracy and Demography (vice president)
A New Push for European Democracy	Helena Dalli	Equality

== Commission departments ==
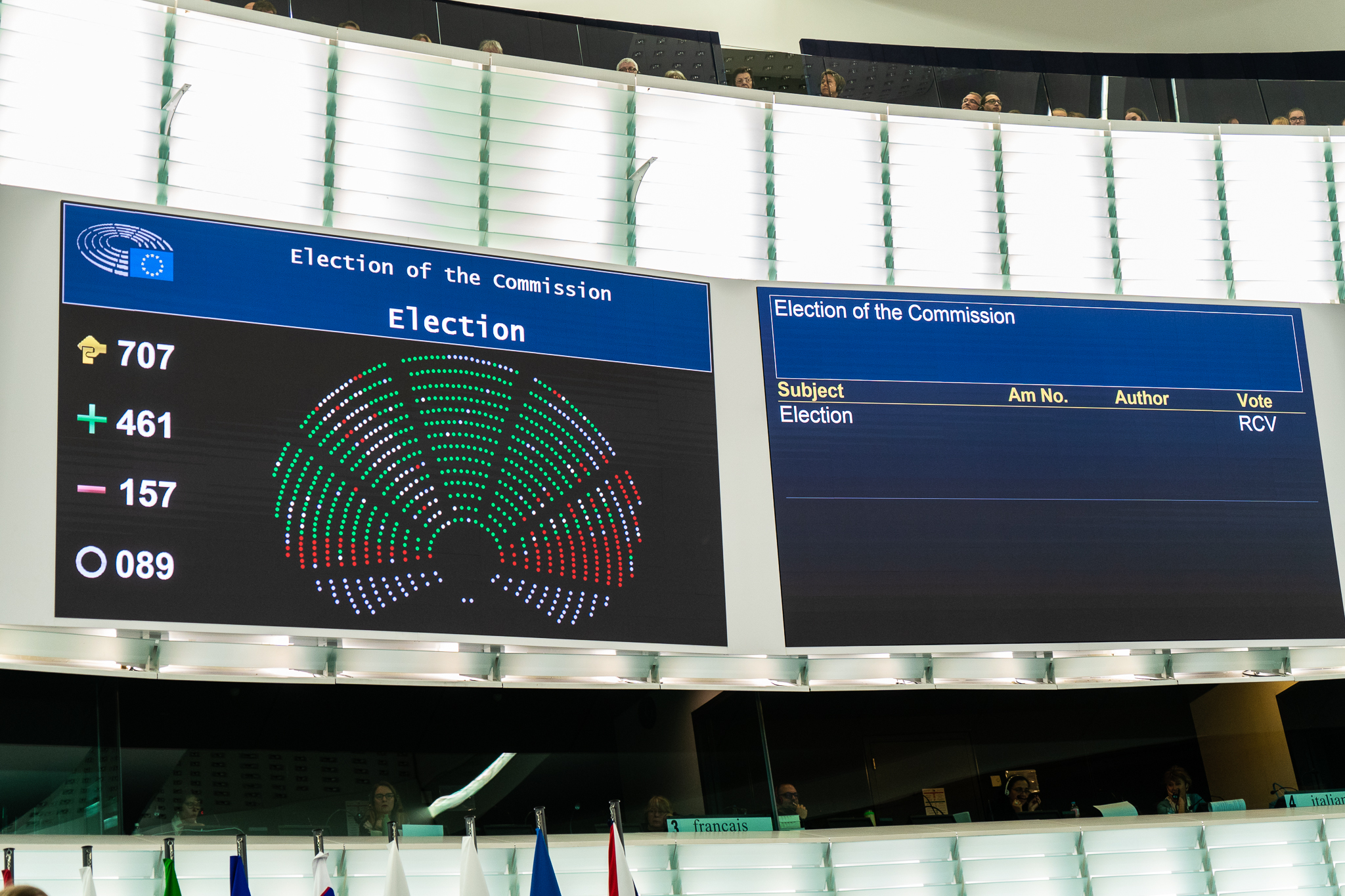
Result of the election of the commission, in the European Parliament in Strasbourg, 27 November 2019

=== Directorates-General ===
Name	Abbr.	Commissioner
Agriculture and Rural Development	AGRI	Janusz Wojciechowski
Budget	BUDG	Johannes Hahn
Climate Action	CLIMA	Wopke Hoekstra
Communications Networks, Content and Technology	CONNECT	Thierry Breton
Communication	COMM	Ursula von der Leyen
Competition	COMP	Margrethe Vestager
Defence Industry and Space	DEFIS	Thierry Breton
Economic and Financial Affairs	ECFIN	Paolo Gentiloni
Education, Youth, Sport and Culture	EAC	Iliana Ivanova
Employment, Social Affairs and Inclusion	EMPL	Nicolas Schmit
Energy	ENER	Kadri Simson
Environment	ENV	Virginijus Sinkevičius
European Civil Protection and Humanitarian Aid Operations	ECHO	Janez Lenarčič
Neighbourhood and Enlargement Negotiations	NEAR	Olivér Várhelyi
Eurostat - European statistics	EUROSTAT	Paolo Gentiloni
Financial Stability, Financial Services and Capital Markets Union	FISMA	Mairead McGuinness
Health Emergency Preparedness and Response Authority	HERA	Stella Kyriakides
Health and Food Safety	SANTE	Stella Kyriakides
Human Resources and Security	HR	Johannes Hahn
Informatics	DIGIT	Johannes Hahn
Internal Audit Service	IAS	Didier Reynders
Internal Market, Industry, Entrepreneurship and SMEs	GROW	Thierry Breton
International Partnerships	INTPA	Jutta Urpilainen
Interpretation	SCIC	Johannes Hahn
Joint Research Centre	JRC	Iliana Ivanova
Justice and Consumers	JUST	Didier Reynders
Justice and Consumers	JUST	Helena Dalli
Maritime Affairs and Fisheries	MARE	Virginijus Sinkevičius
Migration and Home Affairs	HOME	Ylva Johansson
Mobility and Transport	MOVE	Adina Vălean
Regional and Urban Policy	REGIO	Elisa Ferreira
Structural Reform Support	REFORM	Elisa Ferreira
Research and Innovation	RTD	Iliana Ivanova
Taxation and Customs Union	TAXUD	Paolo Gentiloni
Trade	TRADE	Valdis Dombrovskis
Translation	DGT	Johannes Hahn

=== Executive agencies and service departments ===
==== Executive agencies ====
Executive agencies of the Von der Leyen Commission
Executive Agency		Head
Name	Abbr.	Head
European Education and Culture Executive Agency	EACEA	Sophie Beernaerts (acting)
European Research Council Executive Agency	ERCEA	Laurence Moreau
European Innovation Council and SMEs Executive Agency	EISMEA	Jean-David Malo
Research Executive Agency	REA	Marc Tachelet
European Climate, Infrastructure and Environment Executive Agency	CINEA	Paloma Aba Garrote (acting)
Health and Digital Executive Agency	HADEA	Marina Zanchi

==== Service departments ====
Service departments of the Von der Leyen Commission
Service department		Head
Name	Abbr.	Head
Administration and Payment of Individual Entitlements	PMO	
Data Protection Officer	DPO	
European Anti-Fraud Office	OLAF	
European Personnel Selection Office	EPSO	
European Political Strategy Centre	EPSC	
Foreign Policy Instruments	FPI	
Historical Archives Service		
Infrastructure and Logistics in Brussels	OIB	
Infrastructure and Logistics in Luxembourg	OIL	
Innovation and Networks Executive Agency	INEA	
Internal Audit Service	IAS	
Legal Service	SJ	
Library and e-Resources Centre		
Publications Office	OP	
Secretariat-General	SG	
Structural Reform Support Service	SRSS	
Taskforce on Article 50 negotiations with the United Kingdom		

== Brexit vacancy ==
With the three month Brexit delay requested, the United Kingdom had not nominated any British commissioner. This was a unique event with no precedent in the history of the European Union. Von der Leyen had to formally request the British Government nominate an EU commissioner. She also asked the legal service if the commission could operate without a British commissioner. Some MEPs have suggested the possibility of a vote to allow the EU Commission to operate without a British commissioner.

The United Kingdom left the European Union at 23:00 GMT on 31 January 2020, so the position of British commissioner remained vacant until its automatic abolition when Brexit occurred.

== Policy ==
=== European Green Deal ===
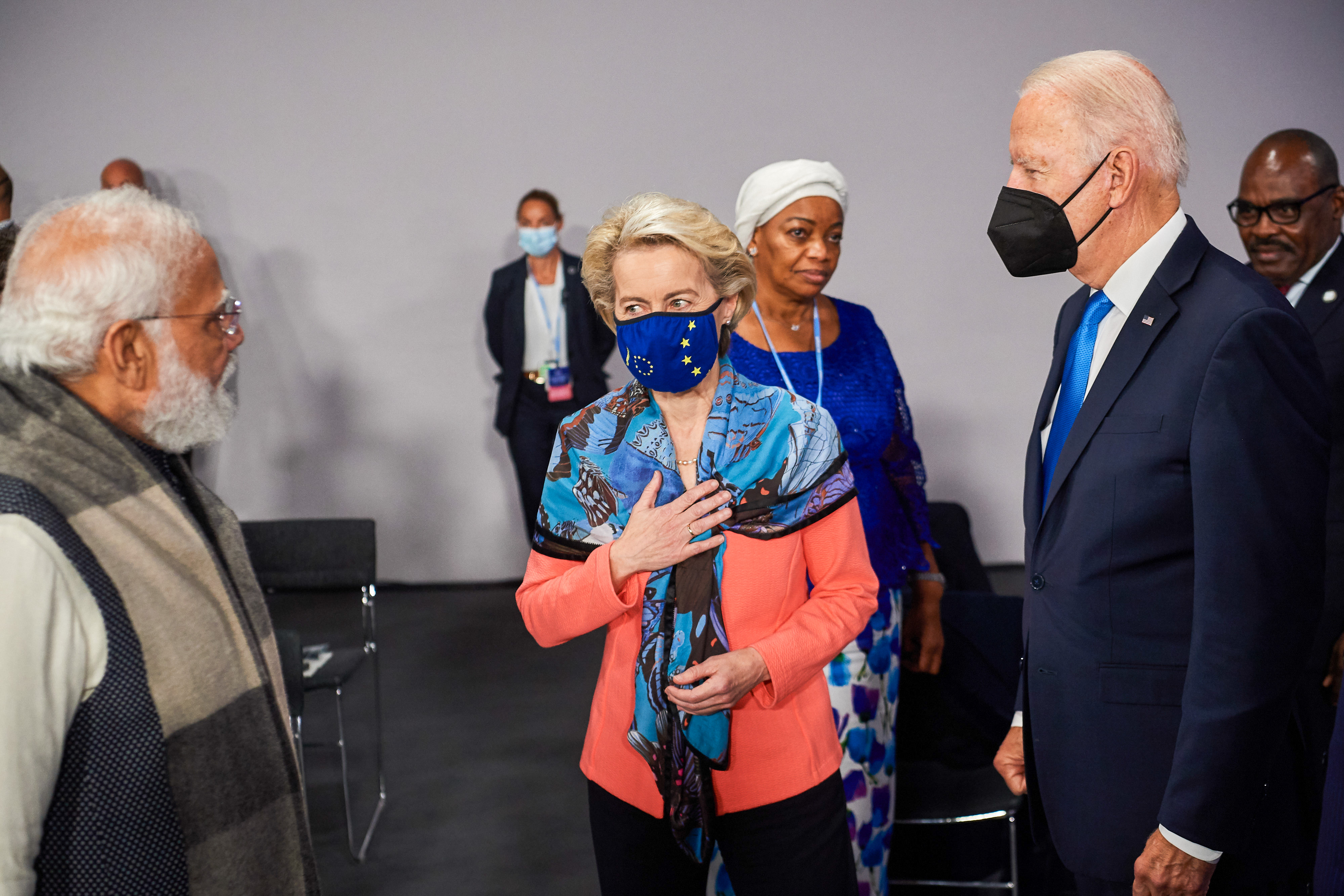
Von der Leyen, Indian prime minister Narendra Modi and U.S. president Joe Biden at the COP26 climate summit in Glasgow on 1 November 2021

The European Green Deal, approved in 2020, is a set of policy initiatives by the Von der Leyen Commission with the overarching aim of making the European Union climate neutral in 2050. Ursula von der Leyen stated that the European Green Deal would be Europe's "man on the moon moment". She said the EU emission trading system is needed to reduce carbon dioxide emissions.

=== New Pact on Migration and Asylum ===
Von der Leyen Commission proposed the EU Asylum and Migration Pact in September 2020. The deal was agreed to on 20 December 2023 between representatives of the European Parliament and the Council of the European Union. Ursula von der Leyen praised the EU Asylum and Migration Pact as a "huge achievement for Europe". Countries where migrants first arrive will newly be able to relocate a total of up to 30,000 migrants per year to other EU member states. The Pact will institute a "mandatory solidarity mechanism". The Pact has been criticized by some right-wing politicians for not going far enough to prevent illegal immigration, such as missing provisions relating to migrant returns.

The provisions of The Pact apply to migrants caught illegally crossing an external EU border, such as those reaching the shores of Greece, Italy or Spain via the Mediterranean Sea or Atlantic Ocean on boats provided by smugglers; estimated at around 300,000 migrants in 2023. Provisions do not apply to legal migrants to the EU (~3.5 million in 2023) and migrants who arrived legally but overstayed their visas (~700,000 in 2023).

=== Geopolitical commission ===
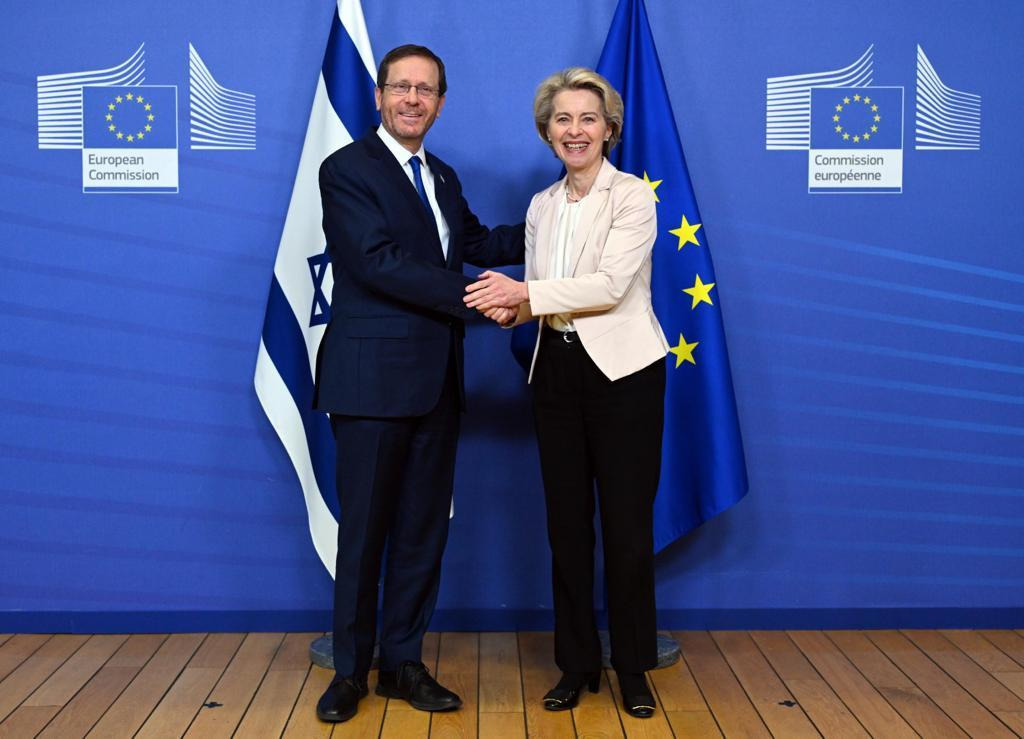
Von der Leyen with Israeli President Isaac Herzog in Brussels, 2023

From the outset of her mandate as President of the European Commission, von der Leyen stated her intention to have a "geopolitical commission". French president Emmanuel Macron is the most important driving force behind the ambition of a geopolitical commission. His vision is that the EU must become a political and strategic player with one voice. Critics have pointed out that by flying the geopolitical flag, von der Leyen has exposed the weaknesses of the EU as a whole in playing a decisive role at the high diplomatic table.

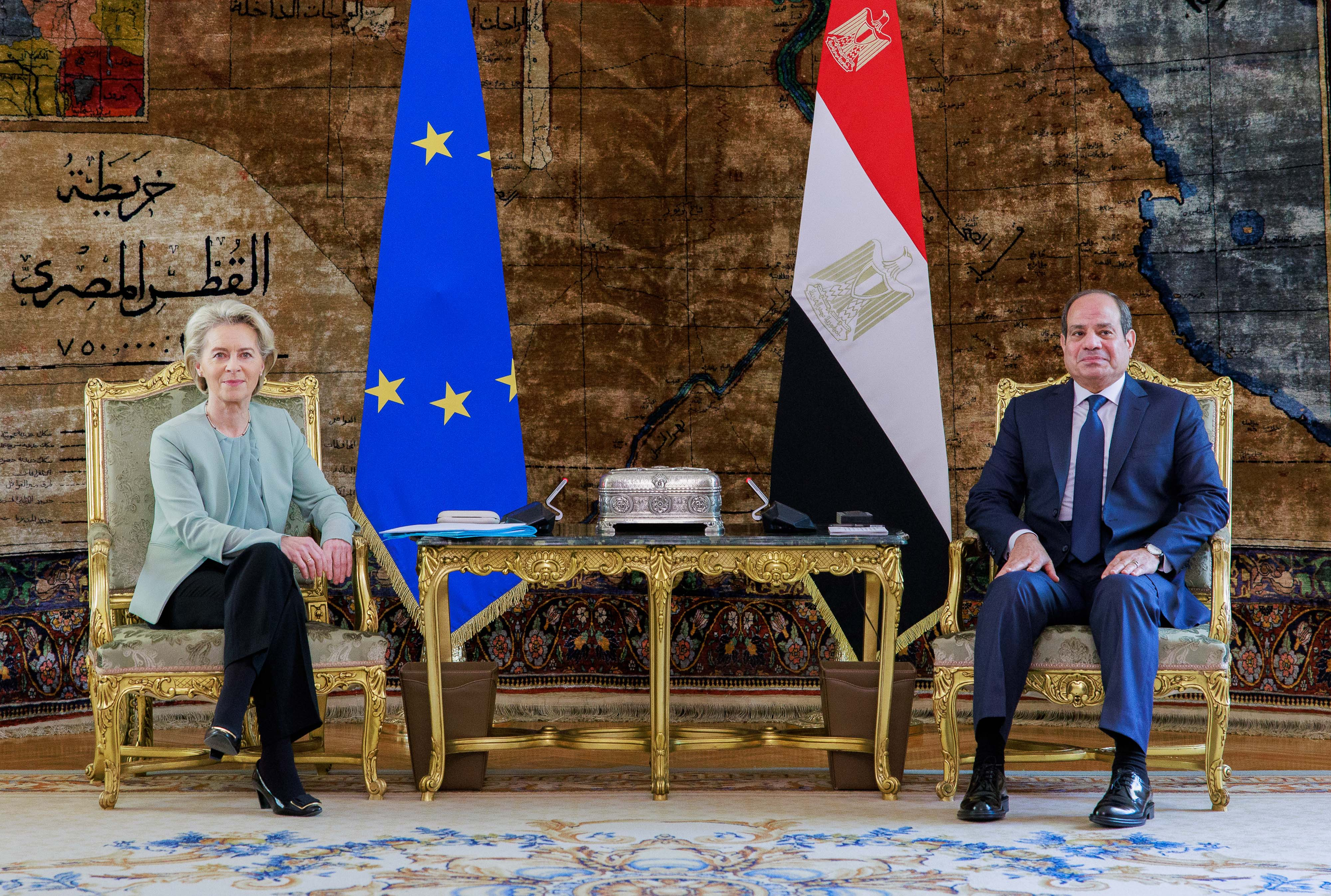
Ursula von der Leyen and Egyptian President Abdel Fattah el-Sisi in Cairo, Egypt on 18 November 2023

Ursula von der Leyen accompanied French President Emmanuel Macron to the 2023 France–China Summit.

In 2023, the Von der Leyen Commission and Egyptian President Abdel Fattah el-Sisi negotiated the creation of a "strategic partnership" between the EU and Egypt.

=== Corruption ===
In 2022, four people were arrested for corruption in the European Parliament. This came to be known as the Qatar corruption scandal at the European Parliament. Von der Leyen said the allegations were "very serious" and called for the creation of a new ethics body to oversee the European Union.

=== Competitiveness ===
Competitiveness and economic security emerged as key themes during Von der Leyen's first term. In 2023, she commissioned ex-ECB head Mario Draghi to write a report on enhancing the EU's competitiveness in the face of Chinese and US competition. The Draghi report was announced in VDL's State of the Union 2023 address and presented a year later in September 2024, during the formation phase of Von der Leyen's second term college of commissioners.

=== COVID-19 ===
In response to the COVID-19 pandemic, the EU passed the Next Generation EU package, worth 750 billion euros. Von der Leyen's Commission proposed the package on 27 May 2020.

== Criticism ==
Speaking at the COP26 climate summit in Glasgow, Czech Prime Minister Andrej Babiš criticised the von der Leyen Commission, saying that it "continues to propose dangerous policies such as the ban on combustible engines in 2035, or carbon allowances for transport and individual housing. Due to improper legislature and speculation, the price of emission allowances has gone out of control, resulting in the surging costs of electricity."

Poland's Prime Minister Mateusz Morawiecki said that the EU's carbon pricing system unfairly disadvantages poorer countries in Southern and Eastern Europe. In August 2023, the Polish government filed a series of complaints with the Court of Justice of the European Union (CJEU) against provisions that are part of the Fit for 55 package, claiming that three EU climate policies threaten Poland's economy and energy security.
