= Iliana Ivanova =

Bulgarian politician

- Илиана Иванова
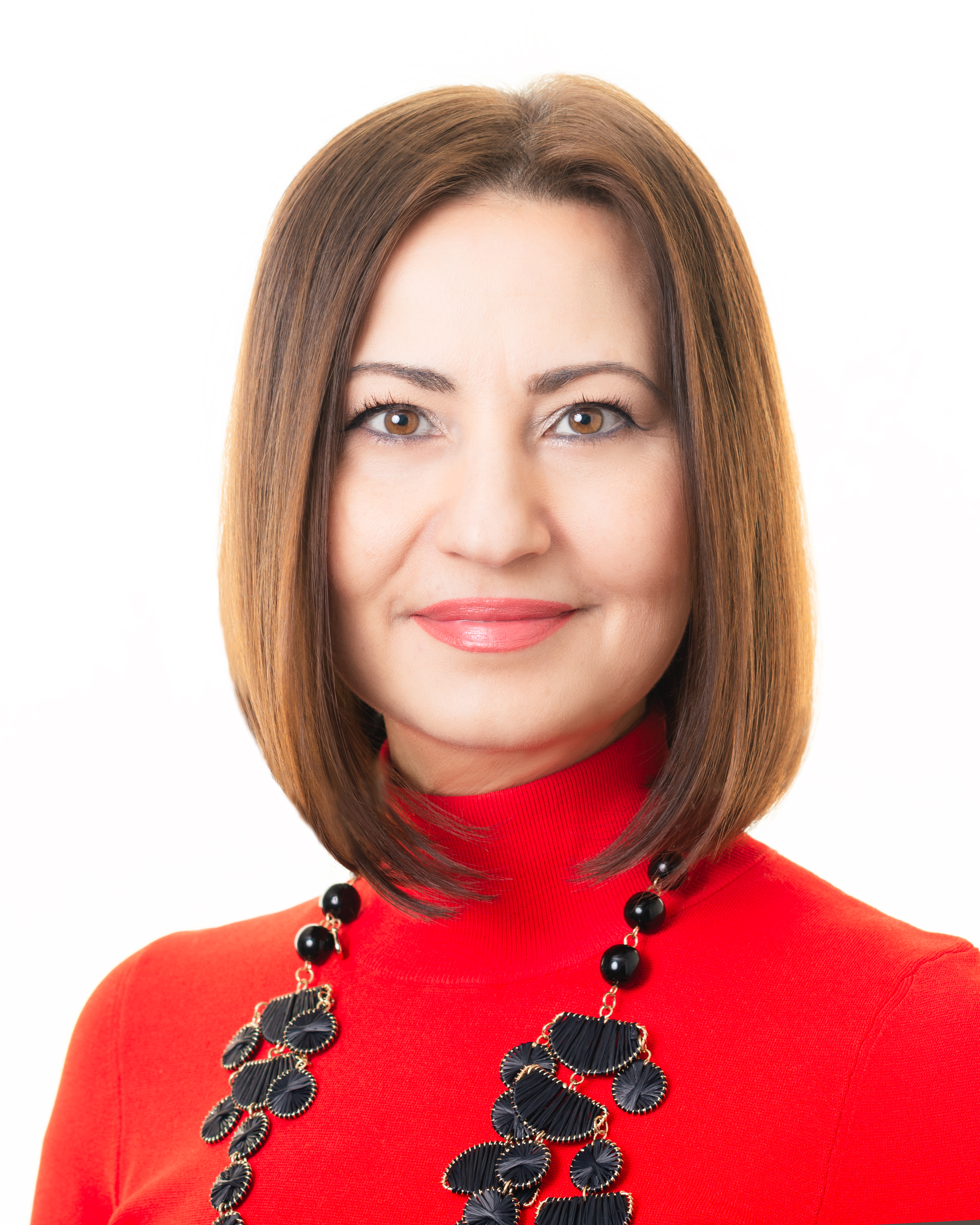
- Iliana Ivanova in 2025

Member of the European Court of Auditors for Bulgaria
- Incumbent
- Assumed office 1 January 2025

European Commissioner for Innovation, Research, Culture, Education and Youth
- In office 19 September 2023 – 30 November 2024
- Commission: Von der Leyen I
- Preceded by: Mariya Gabriel
- Succeeded by: Ekaterina Zaharieva

Member of the European Parliament
- In office 14 July 2009 – 31 December 2012
- Preceded by: Nickolay Mladenov

Personal details
- Born: 14 September 1975 (age 51) Stara Zagora, Bulgaria
- Party: Citizens for European; Development
- Other political affiliations: European People's Party
- Education: University of Economics, Varna (BA, MA); Arizona State University, Phoenix (MBA)

Iliana Naydenova Ivanova (Bulgarian: Илиана Найденова Иванова; born 14 September 1975) is a Member of the European Court of Auditors since 1 January 2025. She previously served as European Commissioner for Innovation, Research, Culture, Education and Youth between 2023 and 2024.

== Early life and education ==
Ivanova graduated from foreign language high school Romain Rolland in her hometown where she studied French and English. In 1998 she graduated with a bachelor's degree in International Economic Relations from the Economic University in Varna. In 2004 Ivanova defended her master's thesis in International Finance at the Thunderbird School of Global Management Arizona.

== Early career ==
Ivanova worked as a coordinator for relations to international financial institutions at the Ministry of Agriculture, Food and Forestry.

== Member of the European Parliament ==
From 2009 to 2012, Ivanova was a Member of the European Parliament. During that period, she served as vice-chair of the Committee on Budgetary Control, Vice-chair of the Special Committee on the Economic, Financial and Social crisis, member of the Committee on the Internal Market and Consumer Protection and as substitute member of the Committee on Economic and Monetary Affairs. In addition to her committee assignments, she was one of the vice-chairs of the parliament's delegation to China.

== Life after politics ==
As of the end of 2012, Ivanova has ceased all her political activities and affiliations.

Since 1 January 2013 Ivanova has been serving as a Member of the European Court of Auditors. Ivanova was rapporteur for 27 audit reports, including topics such as regional development, cohesion, the Youth Unemployment Initiative and the Youth Guarantee, the European Digital Agenda and innovations, digital skills, education, as well as the instruments for the initial EU response to the COVID-19 crisis. She was elected Dean of Chamber II, responsible for auditing structural policies, transport, for three consecutive mandates. Since November 2022, she has been serving as Chair of the Audit quality control committee, with particular responsibility to oversee quality control of all RRF tasks across the ECA.

In June 2023, the Ivanova was nominated by the Bulgarian Government European Commissioner from Bulgaria. On 28 June 2023, European Commission President Ursula von der Leyen proposed to the European Parliament and the Council to appoint Ivanova to the post of Commissioner for Innovation, Research, Culture, Education and Youth. She was appointed as member of the European Commission on 19 September 2023.

Following her end of term as Commissioner, Iliana Ivanova was an appointed as Member of the European Court of Auditors from 1 January 2025 for a six-year mandate. Ivanova was assigned to Chamber I: Sustainable use of natural resources.

Political offices
Preceded by Mariya Gabriel	Bulgarian European Commissioner; 2023–present	Incumbent
Preceded by Margaritis Schinas; Acting	European Commissioner for Innovation, Research, Culture, Education and Youth; 2023–present	Incumbent
