= European Commissioner for Startups, Research and Innovation =

Member of the EU Commission

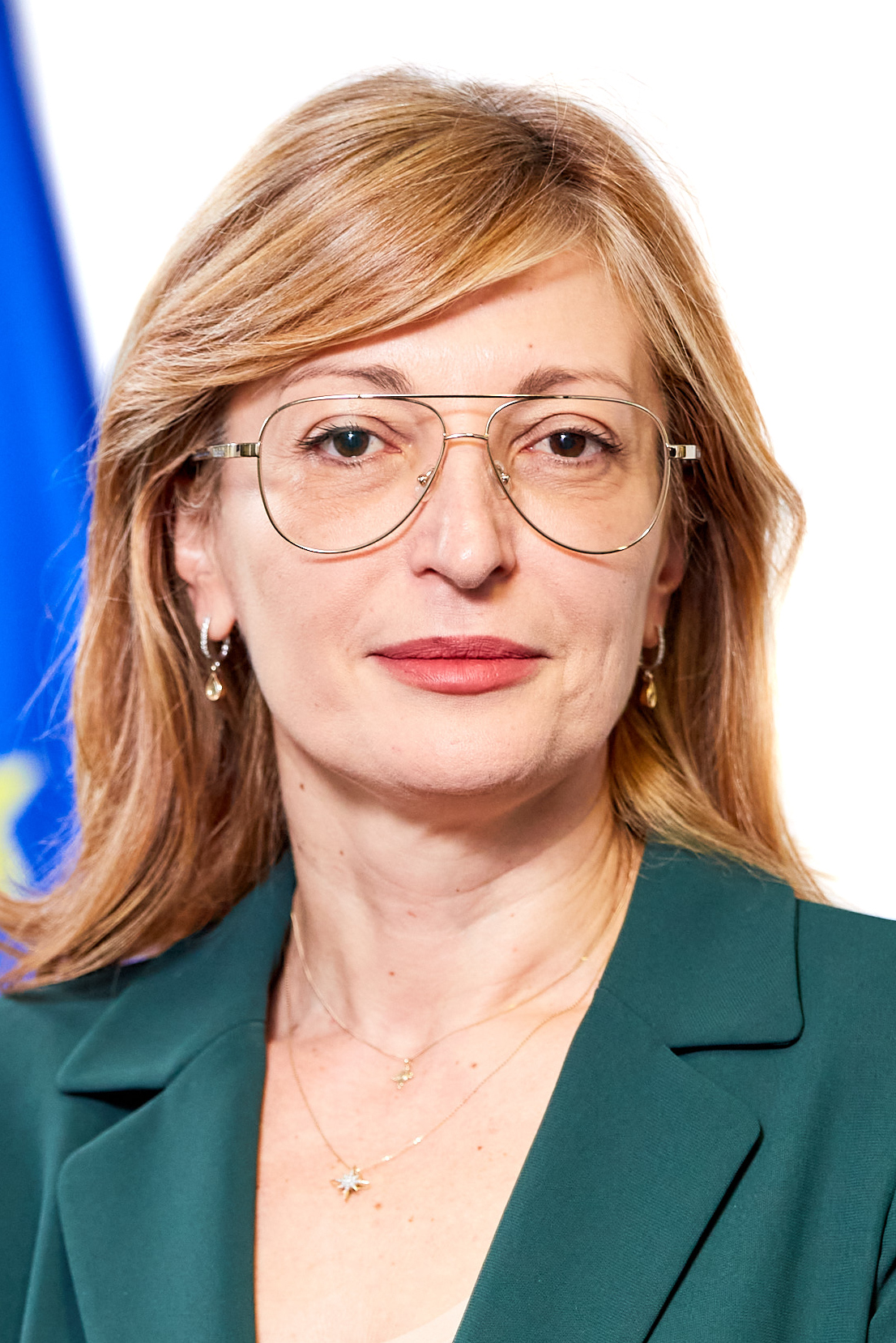
- Incumbent; Ekaterina Zaharieva since 1 December 2024
- Style: Madam. Commissioner
- Member of: the European Commission
- Reports to: President of the European Commission
- Term length: 5 years
- Precursor: Commissioner for Innovation, Research, Culture, Education and Youth
- Formation: 13 September 1999; 26 years ago
- First holder: Viviane Reding
- Website: Commissioner's Website

The European Commissioner for Startups, Research and Innovation is a member of the European Commission. The portfolio was previously titled European Commissioner for Education, Culture, Youth and Sport until 2019 when it was merged with the European Commissioner for Research, Science and Innovation to form its current title.

== History of the portfolio ==
Commissioner Ján Figeľ was approved by the European Parliament in 2004 as the European Commissioner for Education, Training, Culture and Multilingualism. This was enlarged since the Prodi Commission with the addition of training and multilingualism (The Directorate-General is still just Directorate-General for Education and Culture).

However, when Romania joined the European Union on 1 January 2007, responsibility for multilingualism was handed over to the new Romanian commissioner, Leonard Orban. In its place the portfolio now also includes youth, sport and civil society. Figeľ describes his position is very orientated to "the citizens and their quality of life".

The commission has become increasingly active in education. The ERASMUS programme, which was established in 1987, is a student exchange programme promoting mobility of students between European universities. The Bologna process aims to create a European Higher Education Area where academic qualifications can be recognised across Europe. The European Institute of Technology is a proposed research university.

With the 2014 inauguration of the Juncker Commission, the portfolio was once again renamed – multilingualism was removed in favour of citizenship: "Education, Culture, Youth and Citizenship". Citizenship in turn was soon replaced by sport. The title from 2014 to 2019 was thus European Commissioner for Education, Culture, Youth and Sport. The portfolio from 2019 is named European Commissioner for Startups, Research and Innovation.

== List of commissioners ==
The previous portfolio to the current was Culture, merged with Audiovisual policy and EP relations.

No.	Picture	Commissioner	Took office	Left office	Time in office	Party	Country	Commission
1	Viviane Reding	Viviane Reding (born 1951)	13 September 1999	21 November 2004	5 years, 69 days	CSV	Luxembourg	Prodi
2	Dalia Grybauskaitė	Dalia Grybauskaitė (born 1956)	1 May 2004	11 November 2004	194 days	Independent	Lithuania	Prodi
3	Ján Figeľ	Ján Figeľ (born 1960)	22 November 2004	1 October 2009	4 years, 313 days	KDH	Slovakia	Barroso
4	Maroš Šefčovič	Maroš Šefčovič (born 1966)	1 October 2009	9 February 2010	131 days	PES	Slovakia	Barroso
5	Androulla Vassiliou	Androulla Vassiliou (born 1943)	9 February 2010	1 November 2014	4 years, 265 days	EDI	Cyprus	Barroso
6	Tibor Navracsics	Tibor Navracsics (born 1966)	1 November 2014	30 November 2019	5 years, 29 days	Fidesz	Hungary	Juncker
7	Mariya Gabriel	Mariya Gabriel (born 1979)	1 December 2019	15 May 2023	3 years, 166 days	GERB	Bulgaria	Von der Leyen
8	Iliana Ivanova	Iliana Ivanova (born 1975)	19 September 2023	30 November 2024	1 year, 72 days	GERB	Bulgaria	Von der Leyen
9	Ekaterina Zaharieva	Ekaterina Zaharieva (born 1975)	1 December 2024	Incumbent	1 year, 280 days	GERB	Bulgaria	Von der Leyen II

== See also ==
- Directorate-General for Education and Culture
- Directorate-General for Interpretation
- ERASMUS programme
- European Institute of Innovation and Technology
- Lux Prize for European Cinema
