= Paymaster's Office (European Commission) =

The Office for the Administration and Payment of Individual Entitlements (PMO), also known as the Paymaster's Office, is an administrative service of the European Commission.

The PMO's mission is to manage the financial rights of permanent, temporary and contractual staff working at the Commission, to calculate and to pay their salaries and other financial entitlements. The PMO provides these services to other EU institutions and agencies as well. The PMO is also responsible for managing the health insurance fund of the Institutions, together with processing and paying the claims of reimbursement from staff members. The PMO also manages the pension fund and pays the pensions of retired staff members.

The PMO's head office, horizontal services and four operational units are located in Brussels, while two other units are located in Luxembourg and in Ispra, where they provide services to local EU staff.

== PMO activities ==
=== Remuneration ===
The PMO determines and records the financial rights of new staff members of their first day at the Commission, and then calculates and pays their remuneration. The remuneration includes:

- a basic salary according to Article 66 of the Staff Regulation
- family allowances, as per Section 1 of Annex VII of the Staff Regulation
- other allowances (Section 2 of Annex VII)

Basic monthly Commission salaries range from around €2,300 per month for a newly recruited AST 1 official to around €16,000 per month for a top level AD 16 official with over 4 years of seniority. Each grade is broken up into five seniority steps with corresponding salary increases. Basic salaries are adjusted annually in line with inflation and purchasing power in the EU countries.

Officials are also entitled to the reimbursement of certain expenses, for example travel expenses for taking up their duties or removal expenses, when moving their families to their place of employment.

=== Health insurance ===
PMO manages the Joint Sickness Insurance Scheme (JSIS) of the European Communities. Officials and other agents are entitled to benefit from the JSIS, as well as their family members (under certain conditions). The JSIS covers medical expenses at a rate of 80% for medical treatments and is funded by a contribution of ~2%, deducted from the salaries of officials and agents.

=== Pensions ===
An official is entitled to an EU pension after at least 10 years of service (or if he reaches the age of 63). EU officials normally reach retirement age at 63, but it is also possible to take early retirement with a reduced pension from the age of 55, or to work up until the age of 67 (but with no corresponding increase in pension rights).

Officials accumulate 1.9% pension rights every year and are entitled to a maximum pension of 70% of their final basic salary. Upon leaving active service, the PMO calculates the pension rights of officials and other agents, including the rights transferred in from national pension schemes. In the case of the decease of officials, the pension rights are paid to the surviving spouse and/or child(ren).

Officials and other agents contribute to up to 1/3 of the costs of the pension scheme. Their contribution is 9.25% of their monthly basic salary and is deducted monthly.

=== Unemployment benefits ===
Temporary and contractual agents may receive a temporary unemployment allowance, when their contract with the Commission expires. This allowance is calculated and paid by the PMO, in accordance with Title 2 of Conditions of employment of other servants of the European Communities.

=== Missions and experts' expenses ===
The expenses incurred by the officials and agents on their official missions, as well as certain experts engaged by the Commission, are reimbursed. The PMO receives and processes all these claims and then pays the expenses according to the rules governing entitlement.

For the experts' expenses, the following persons are entitled:

- anyone outside the Commission who has been invited to participate in the work of a certain commission or to give a professional opinion
- anyone responsible for accompanying a disabled person who was invited as an external expert

The entitlement covers a daily allowance, travel and accommodation expenses.

== See also ==
- European Civil Service

== Sources ==
- Office for Administration and Payment of individual entitlements (in English)
- Staff Regulation of Officials of the European Communities (in English)
