= Janez Lenarčič =

Slovenian diplomat and politician

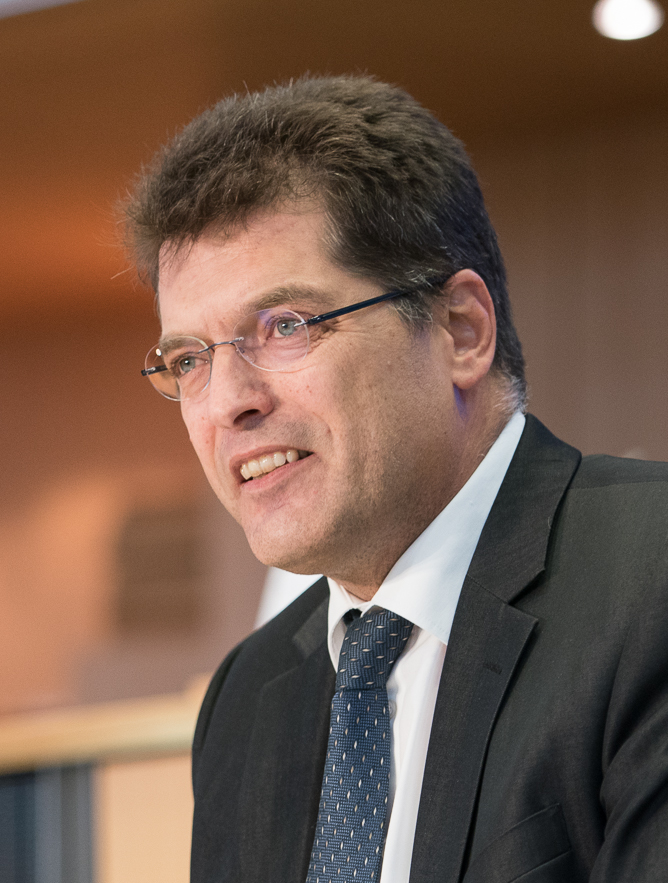
- Lenarčič in 2019

European Commissioner for Crisis Management
- In office 1 December 2019 – 30 November 2024
- Commission: Von der Leyen I
- Preceded by: Christos Stylianides (Humanitarian Aid and Crisis Management)
- Succeeded by: Hadja Lahbib

Personal details
- Born: 6 November 1967 (age 58) Ljubljana, SR Slovenia, SFR Yugoslavia (now Slovenia)
- Party: Independent
- Education: University of Ljubljana

Janez Lenarčič (born 6 November 1967) is a Slovenian diplomat who served as European Commissioner for Crisis Management in the first Von der Leyen Commission from 2019 to 2024. He is a former director of the Office for Democratic Institutions and Human Rights within the Organization for Security and Co-operation in Europe.

== Early life and education ==
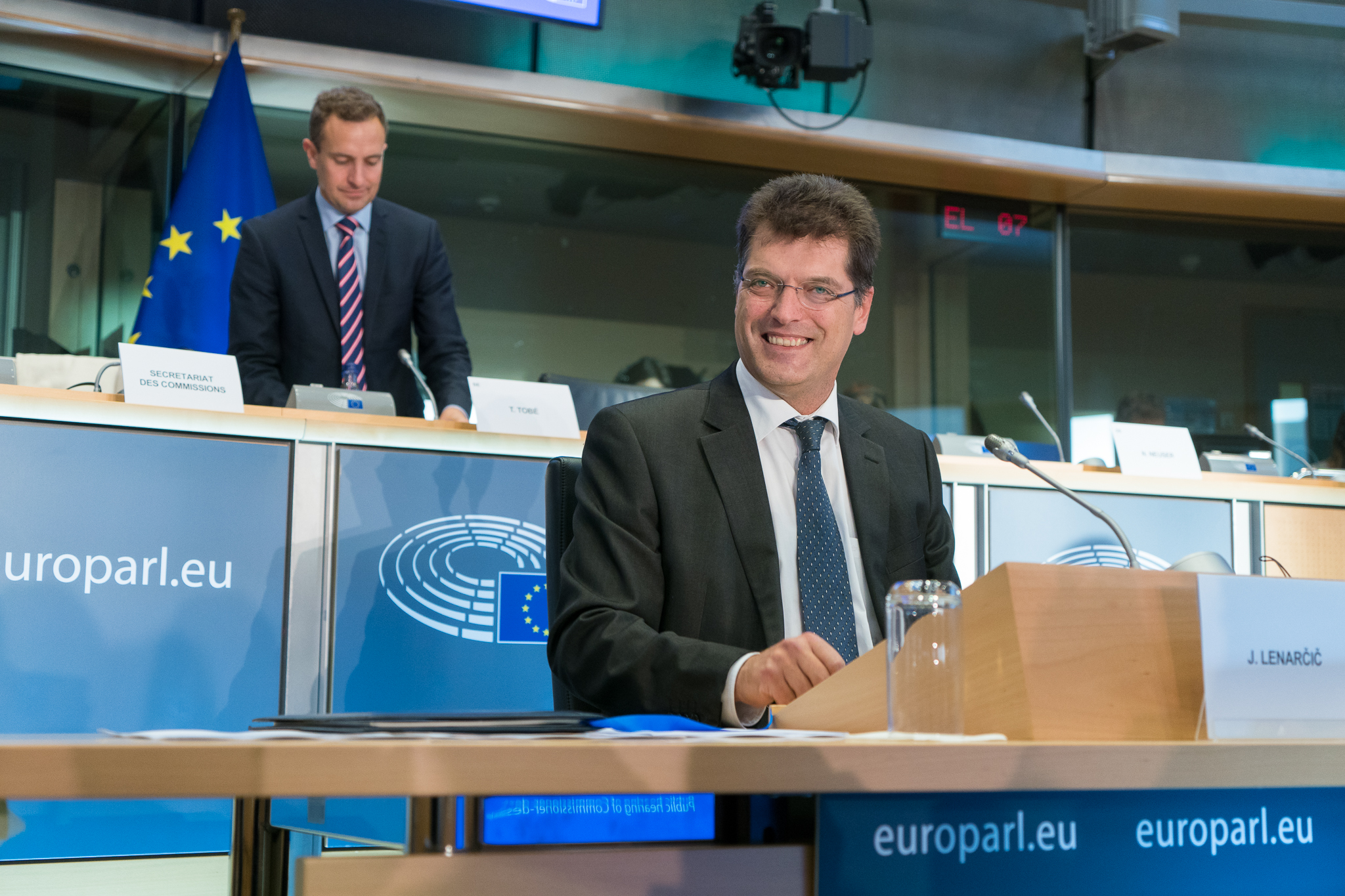
Lenarčič appears before the European Parliament in 2019 for his confirmation hearing as European Commissioner for Crisis Management.

Lenarčič holds a degree in international law from the University of Ljubljana, 1992.

== Career in diplomacy ==
Lenarčič entered the Slovenian foreign service in 1992 . His first posting in 1994-1999 was at the Mission of Slovenia to the United Nations in New York. From 2000 to 2001 Lenarčič worked as adviser to the foreign minister and Prime Minister Janez Drnovšek. From 2002 to 2003 he served as secretary of state in the office of the prime minister. Lenarčič was ambassador of Slovenia to the Organization for Security and Co-operation in Europe (OSCE) in Vienna from 2003 to 2006, and chaired the OSCE Permanent Council in 2005 during the Slovenian chairmanship. From 2006 to 2008 Lenarčič was secretary of state for European affairs, including representing Slovenia during the Lisbon Treaty negotiations in 2007 and later representing the Slovenian EU Council Presidency to the European Parliament in 2008.

Lenarčič then moved to Warsaw as Director of the OSCE's Office for Democratic Institutions and Human Rights (ODIHR) until 2014.

In 2014 Lenarčič was named secretary of state in the cabinet of the Slovenian Prime Minister Miro Cerar. In 2016 he moved to Brussels as Permanent Representative of Slovenia to the EU.

== Member of the European Commission, 2019–2024 ==
In 2019 Lenarčič was nominated by Prime Minister Marjan Šarec (Renew Europe) for the post of Slovenia's European Commissioner in the Commission led by Ursula von der Leyen.

In early March 2020, Lenarčič was appointed by von der Leyen to serve on the commission's special task force to coordinate the European Union's response to the COVID-19 pandemic.

Lenarčič term ended 30 November 2024, as von der Leyen's second Commission acceded.

== Awards ==
Lenarčič received France's highest award, the Légion d'honneur.

Political offices
Preceded by Violeta Bulc	Slovenian European Commissioner; 2019–	Incumbent
