= Margaritis Schinas =

Greek politician

- Μαργαρίτης Σχοινάς
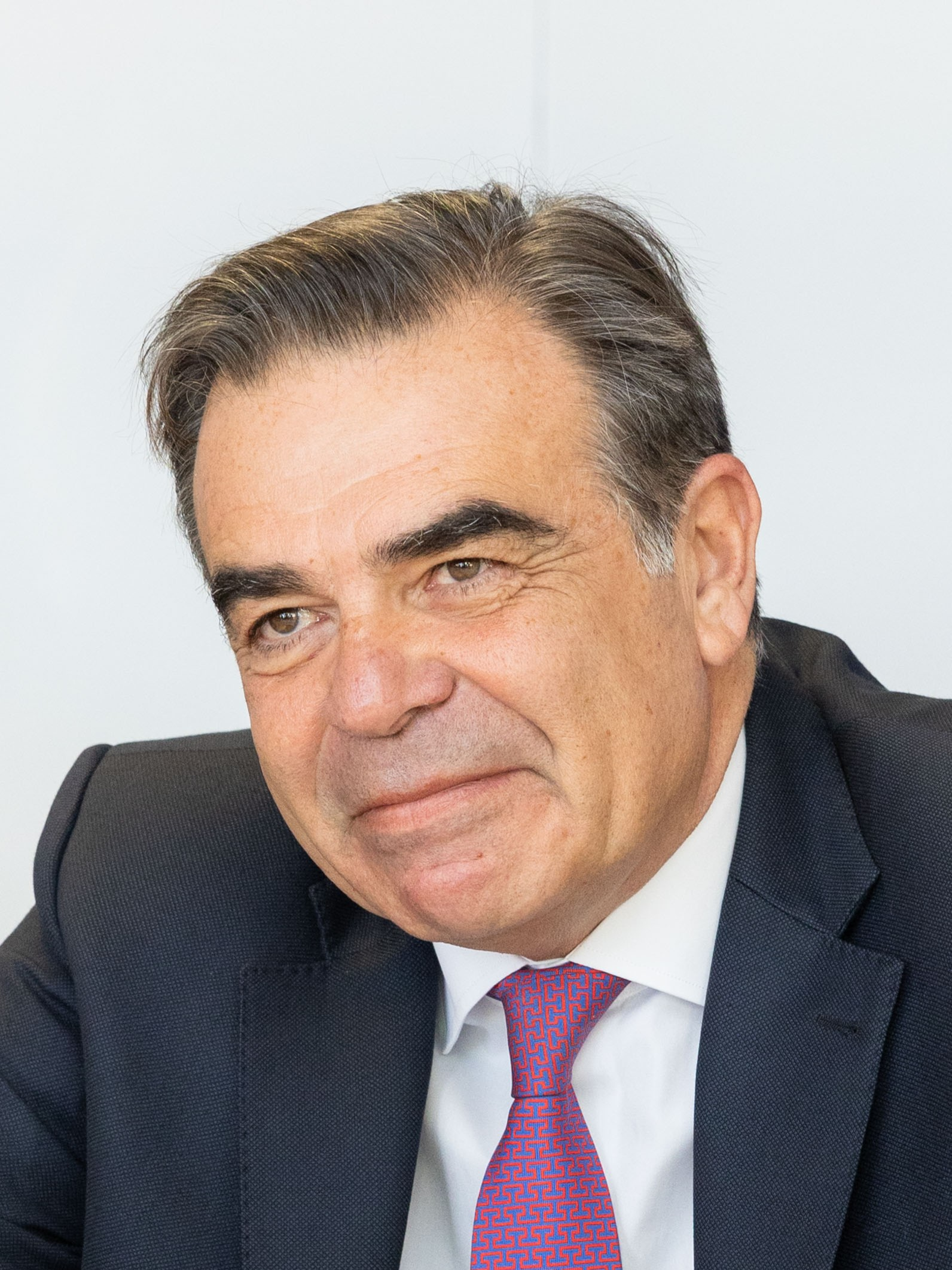
- Schinas in 2026

Minister for Rural Development and Food
- Incumbent
- Assumed office 4 April 2026
- Prime Minister: Kyriakos Mitsotakis
- Preceded by: Konstantinos Tsiaras

Vice-President of the European Commission
- In office 1 December 2019 – 30 November 2024
- Commission: Von der Leyen I

European Commissioner for Promoting our European Way of Life
- In office 1 December 2019 – 30 November 2024
- Commission: Von der Leyen I
- Preceded by: Position established

Member of the European Parliament
- In office 25 September 2007 – 13 July 2009
- Constituency: Greece

Personal details
- Born: July 28, 1962 (age 63) Thessaloniki, Greece
- Party: New Democracy
- Other political affiliations: European People's Party
- Spouse: Mercedes Alvargonzález
- Children: 2
- Education: University of Thessaloniki (LLB); College of Europe (DEA); London School of Economics (MSc)

Margaritis Schinas (Greek: Μαργαρίτης Σχοινάς, IPA: [maɾɣaˈɾitis sçiˈnas]; born 28 July 1962) is a Greek politician and former civil servant who currently serves as Minister for Rural Development and Food in the second cabinet of Kyriakos Mitsotakis. He previously served as vice-president in the Von der Leyen Commission with the portfolio of European Commissioner for Promoting our European Way of Life from 2019 to 2024. A member of the New Democracy party, he previously was a Member of the European Parliament (MEP) from 2007 to 2009 and served as chief spokesperson of the European Commission from 2014 to 2019, and as a deputy director-general of the European Commission's Directorate-General for Communication between 2015 and 2019.

== Early life and education ==
Stemming from a family from Fourka, Chalkidiki, Schinas studied at Aristotle University of Thessaloniki, where he received a Bachelor of Laws in 1985. He went on to receive a Diploma of Advanced European Studies (DAES) in European Public Administration from the College of Europe in Bruges in 1986, as well as a further Master of Science in Public Administration and Policy at the London School of Economics in 1987.

In October 2011, he graduated from the EU-funded "High Potential Leadership" Program of the Harvard University School of Business.

== European career ==
Schinas passed the competition for EU officials in 1989, and started working as a eurocrat in the Directorate-General for Transport of the European Commission and then at the European Commission Representation Office in Athens. From 1999 to 2004, he served as Deputy Chief of Staff in the office of Commissioner Loyola de Palacio, responsible for Transport, Energy and Relations with the European Parliament. From 2004 to 2007 Schinas was head of cabinet of the European Commissioner Markos Kyprianou.

Schinas became an MEP for the New Democracy party (which is part of the European People's Party), following the resignation of Antonis Samaras from the European Parliament on 25 September 2007. During his time in office, he was a member of the Committee on Budgets. He served until 2009 and was not a candidate in the 2009 European elections.

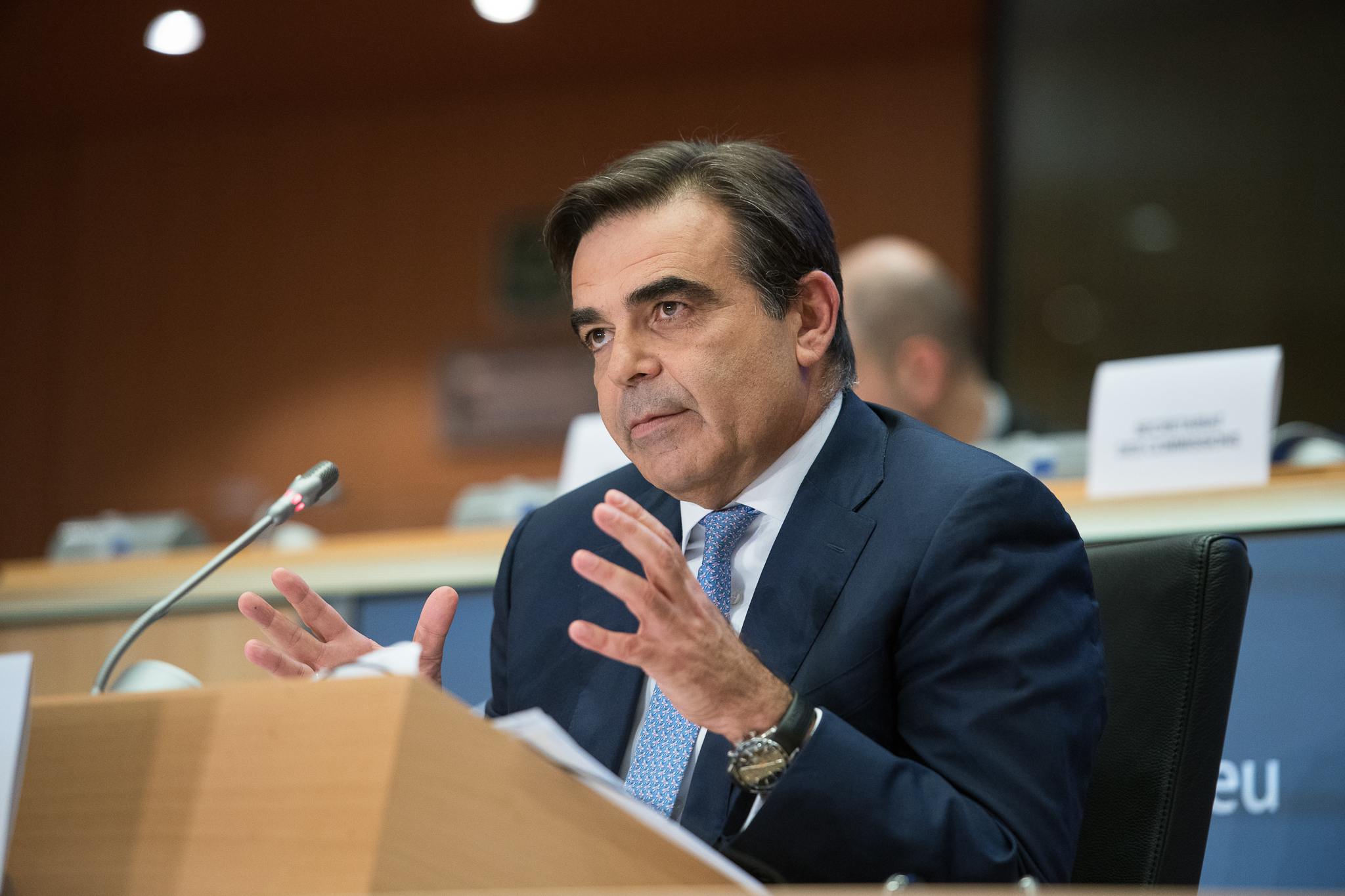
Schinas before the European Parliament in 2019 in hearings for his confirmation as European Commissioner for Protecting our European Way of Life

In 2010, Schinas was appointed Deputy Director of the Bureau of European Policy Advisers by Commission President Barroso. In April 2013 he was appointed Director at the Commission's Directorate-General for Economic and Financial Affairs.

In November 2014, he was appointed acting chief spokesperson for the European Commission, following a proposal from President Jean-Claude Juncker. On 16 December 2015, he was appointed Deputy Director-General of the Directorate-General for Communication of the European Commission.

Following the 2019 European election, Schinas was nominated to serve in the Von der Leyen Commission as the European Commission vice president for “Protecting our European Way of Life”, responsible for upholding the rule-of-law, migration and internal security. He became the first Greek to hold such a high-ranking position in the Europe's top decision-making body. His portfolio was later renamed into "Promoting our European Way of Life". Among this portfolio's thrusts is the European Commission coordinator on combating antisemitism and fostering Jewish life, held by Katharina von Schnurbein since 2015.

Upon completion of his mandate in the European Commission he was appointed "Distinguished Fellow" with the Atlantic Council’s Europe Center. He also leads the Chair on Strategic Autonomy at the Comillas Pontifical University, in Madrid.

== Personal life ==
He speaks Greek, English, French and Spanish. He is married to Mercedes Alvargonzález, a Spanish national, who was like him a student of the College of Europe in Bruges and works for the Secretariat of the European People's Party's Parliamentary Group and its President Manfred Weber. They have two sons, Stergios and Juan.

Schinas is an Aris Thessaloniki supporter.

In March 2020, Schinas was one of the few persons to participate in the start of the Tokyo 2020's Olympic torch relay - cancelled afterwards due to the COVID-19 crisis - in Olympia, Greece, as the third torchbearer after two olympic champions, Greek shooter Anna Korakaki and Japanese marathoner Mizuki Noguchi. He was once again a torchbearer of the Olympic flame for the Olympic Games Paris 2024.

== Honours ==
He has been awarded the "Order of the Redeemer" by the President of the Hellenic Republic. He has also been awarded the "Order of Merit (First Degree)" by the President of Ukraine. In addition, he has received the "Encomienda de la Orden de Isabel la Católica" from the Kingdom of Spain.

Political offices
Preceded by Dimitris Avramopoulos	Greek European Commissioner; 2019–2024	Succeeded by Apostolos Tzitzikostas
