= Louis Michel =

Belgian politician (born 1947)

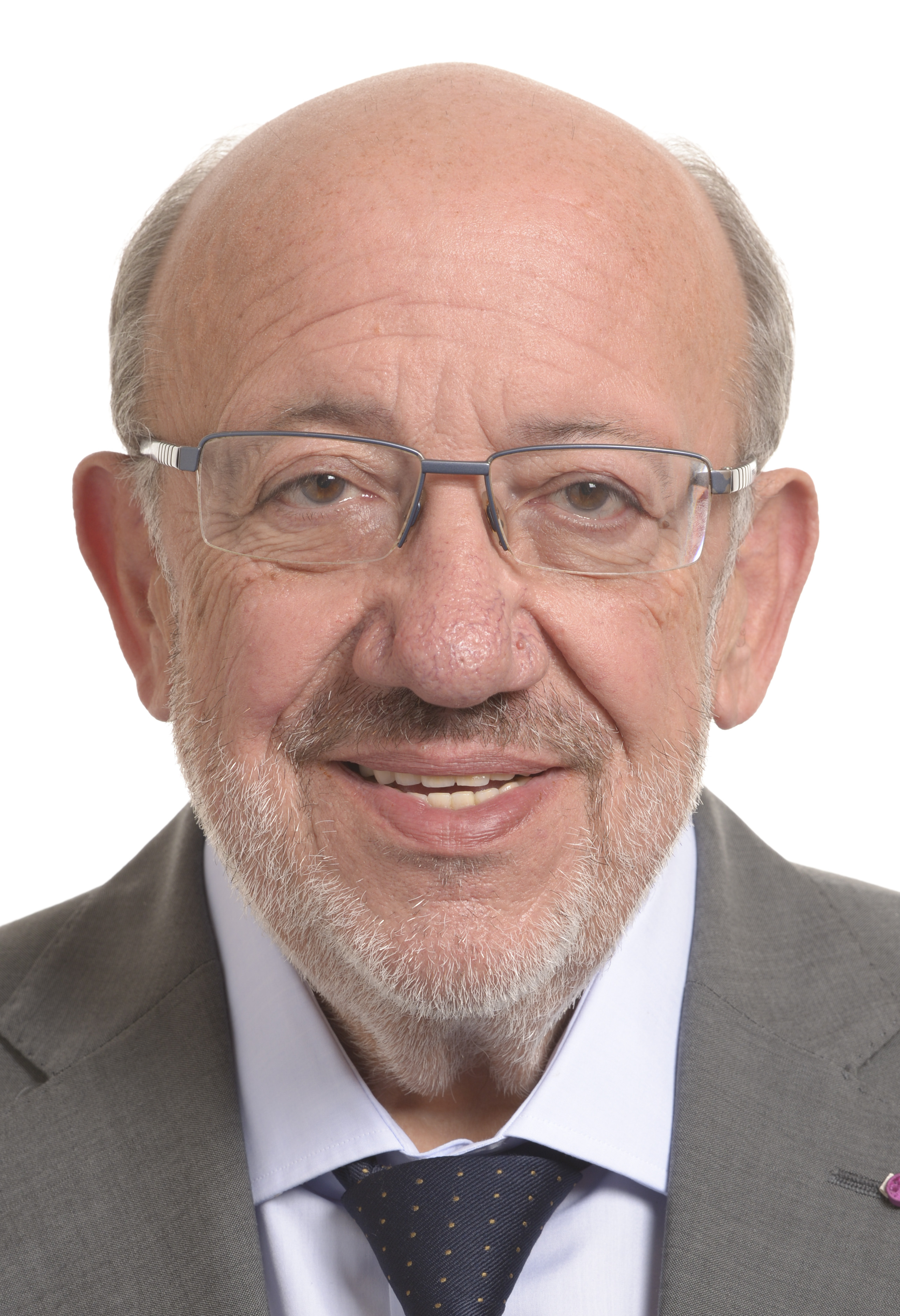

European Commissioner for Development and Humanitarian Aid
- In office 22 November 2004 – 17 July 2009
- President: José Manuel Barroso
- Preceded by: Poul Nielson; Joe Borg
- Succeeded by: Karel De Gucht

European Commissioner for Research
- In office 13 September 2004 – 21 November 2004
- President: Romano Prodi
- Preceded by: Philippe Busquin
- Succeeded by: Janez Potočnik (Science and Research)

Minister of Foreign Affairs
- In office 12 July 1999 – 18 July 2004
- Prime Minister: Guy Verhofstadt
- Preceded by: Erik Derycke
- Succeeded by: Karel De Gucht

Personal details
- Born: 2 September 1947 (age 79) Tienen, Belgium
- Party: Reformist Movement (2002–present)
- Other political affiliations: Liberal Reformist Party (Before 2002)
- Children: Charles Michel, Mathieu Michel
- Profession: Teacher

Louis Michel (French pronunciation: [lwi miʃɛl]; born 2 September 1947) is a Belgian politician. He served in the government of Belgium as minister of foreign affairs from 1999 to 2004 and was European Commissioner for Development and Humanitarian Aid from 2004 to 2009. From 2009 to 2019, he was a Member of the European Parliament. Michel is a prominent member of the French-speaking liberal party, the Mouvement Réformateur. He is the father of Charles Michel, a former prime minister of Belgium and previous president of the European Council.

== Family roots ==
The Michel family comes from the Flemish town Hoegaarden, just across the 1963 official linguistic border and the frontier between the present (since 1994) provinces of Flemish Brabant and Walloon Brabant. There, it has been nicknamed from the 19th century onward as the ‘Sellekes’. Louis Michel "went to school in Hoegaarden and still speaks perfectly the local dialect". His family moved from Hoegaarden to Zétrud-Lumay in 1955.

== Early professional career ==
From 1968 to 1978, before dedicating his life to his political career, Michel taught English, Dutch and German in the Provincial School of Jodoigne, a rural town 25 miles from Brussels.

== Political career ==
From 1967 to 1977, Michel was chairman of the Young Liberals in the district of Nivelles. Then he became alderman in Jodoigne from 1977 to 1983, "secretary-general" of the Parti Réformateur Libéral (PRL) political party from 1980 to 1982 and chairman of the PRL from 1982 to 1990 and from 1995 to 1999.

He was a member of the Belgian federal parliament as a representative (1978–1999).

=== Minister of Foreign Affairs, 1999–2004 ===
Michel was the Belgian foreign minister and vice prime minister from 1999 to 2004. During his time in office, he pursued former Chilean dictator Augusto Pinochet for crimes against humanity and played an active role in trying to bring peace to the war-weary Great Lakes region of central Africa.

In July 2004, the Verhofstadt government appointed Michel as its candidate for the Belgian seat on the European Commission led by José Manuel Durão Barroso, to replace former commissioner Philippe Busquin. He was nominated on 12 August 2004 to become EU commissioner starting in November 2004.

As part of a political agreement, Busquin resigned early in September 2004 to give Louis Michel an early opportunity to serve on the European Commission. Michel completed Busquin's term as the European Commissioner for Science and Research and then served as the European Commissioner for Humanitarian Aid and Development.

He is also the mayor of the municipality of Jodoigne in Walloon Brabant and has been since 1983.

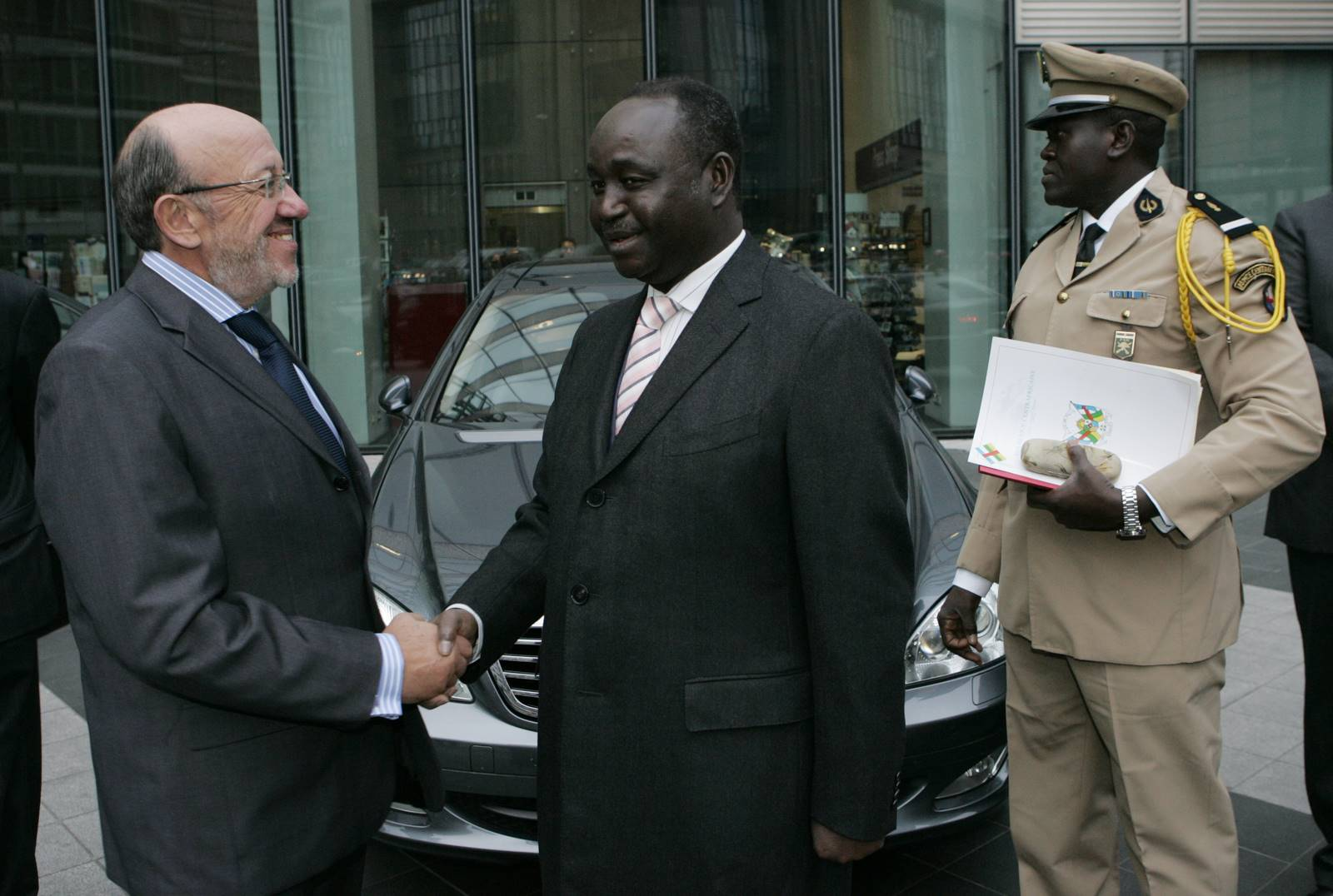
Michel and President of the Central African Republic, François Bozizé, in Brussels, 2007

In 2006, United Nations Secretary-General Kofi Annan appointed him to a High-level Panel on United Nations Systemwide Coherence, which was set up to explore how the United Nations system could work more coherently and effectively across the world in the areas of development, humanitarian assistance and the environment.

Michel withdrew himself from the commission between 12 May and 10 June 2007 to take care of his political party because of the elections of 10 June 2007. He resigned as Commissioner in July 2009 to become a Member of the European Parliament.

=== Member of the European Parliament, 2009–2019 ===
Throughout his time as Member of the European Parliament, Michel served on the Committee on Civil Liberties, Justice and Home Affairs. From 2016 until 2017, he was part of the Committee of Inquiry into Money Laundering, Tax Avoidance and Tax Evasion (PANA) that investigated the Panama Papers revelations and tax avoidance schemes more broadly.

In addition to his committee assignments, Michel co-presided over the ACP–EU Joint Parliamentary Assembly which advises on the orientations of co-operation policies between the EU and its partners in Africa, the Caribbean, and the Pacific. He was also a member of the European Parliament Intergroup on LGBT Rights; the European Parliament Intergroup on Extreme Poverty and Human Rights; and the Campaign for the Establishment of a United Nations Parliamentary Assembly, an organisation which campaigns for democratic reformation of the United Nations, and the creation of a more accountable international political system. He supported the MEP Heart Group, a group of parliamentarians who have an interest in promoting measures that will help reduce the burden of cardiovascular diseases (CVD).

Michel is also a member of the Fondation Chirac's honour committee, ever since the foundation was launched in 2008 by former French president Jacques Chirac to promote world peace.

== Honours ==
- Belgium:
  - Minister of State, by Royal Decree of 1995.
  - Commander in the Order of Leopold.
  - Knight Grand Cross in the Order of Leopold II, RD of 26 May 2014.
- Médaille civique de la classe
- Sweden: Grand Cross of the Royal Order of the Polar Star
- Portugal: Grand Cross of the Order of Infante Dom Henrique
- Netherlands: Knight Grand Cross in the Order of Orange-Nassau.
- Spain: Knight Grand Cross in the Order of Isabella the Catholic
- Denmark: Knight Grand Cross in the Order of the Dannebrog
- Knight Grand-Cross in the Order of the Star of Romania.
- France:
  - Grand officer in the Order of the Pléiade (Ordre de la Francophonie et du dialogue des cultures; that is, "Order of the Francophonie and of the dialogue of cultures")
  - Grand Officer in the Légion d'honneur
- Grand Cordon de l'ordre du Mérite
- Bulgaria: 1st Class in the Order of the Stara Planina / The Balkan Mountains.

== Publications ==
- Horizons : la volonté d'impliquer le citoyen dans la politique internationale, 2004, editions Luc Pire, with introduction by Kofi Annan and Guy Verhofstadt
- Les nouveaux enjeux de la politique étrangère belge, 2003, editions Larcier
- L'Europe, je veux savoir : 110 questions simple sur le grand univers européen, 2001, 2003 et 2004, Editions Luc Pire
- L'axe du Bien, 2003 Editions Luc Pire
- Contre le racisme, J'agis. La conférence mondiale contre le Racisme, la discrimination raciale, la Xénophobie et l'intolérance qui y est associée, 2002
- Lettre aux citoyens de mon pays, 1999, 2003, et 2004
- Objectif 100, La Wallonie j'y crois!, 1988, PRL-Editions
- Rendre confiance, 1998, Editions Luc Pire, Collection politique
- Wallons et Optimismes, 1997, Editions Luc Pire, Collection politique
- De Echte Walen, 1997, Editions Luc Pire, Collection politique
- Libres et forts, projet éducatif pour réussir le futur, 1986
- L'enfant, with collaboration of Philippe Monfils, 1984
- Le défi vert with collaboration of Daniel Ducarme, 1980.

== Political issues ==
=== The Democratic Republic of the Congo dossier ===
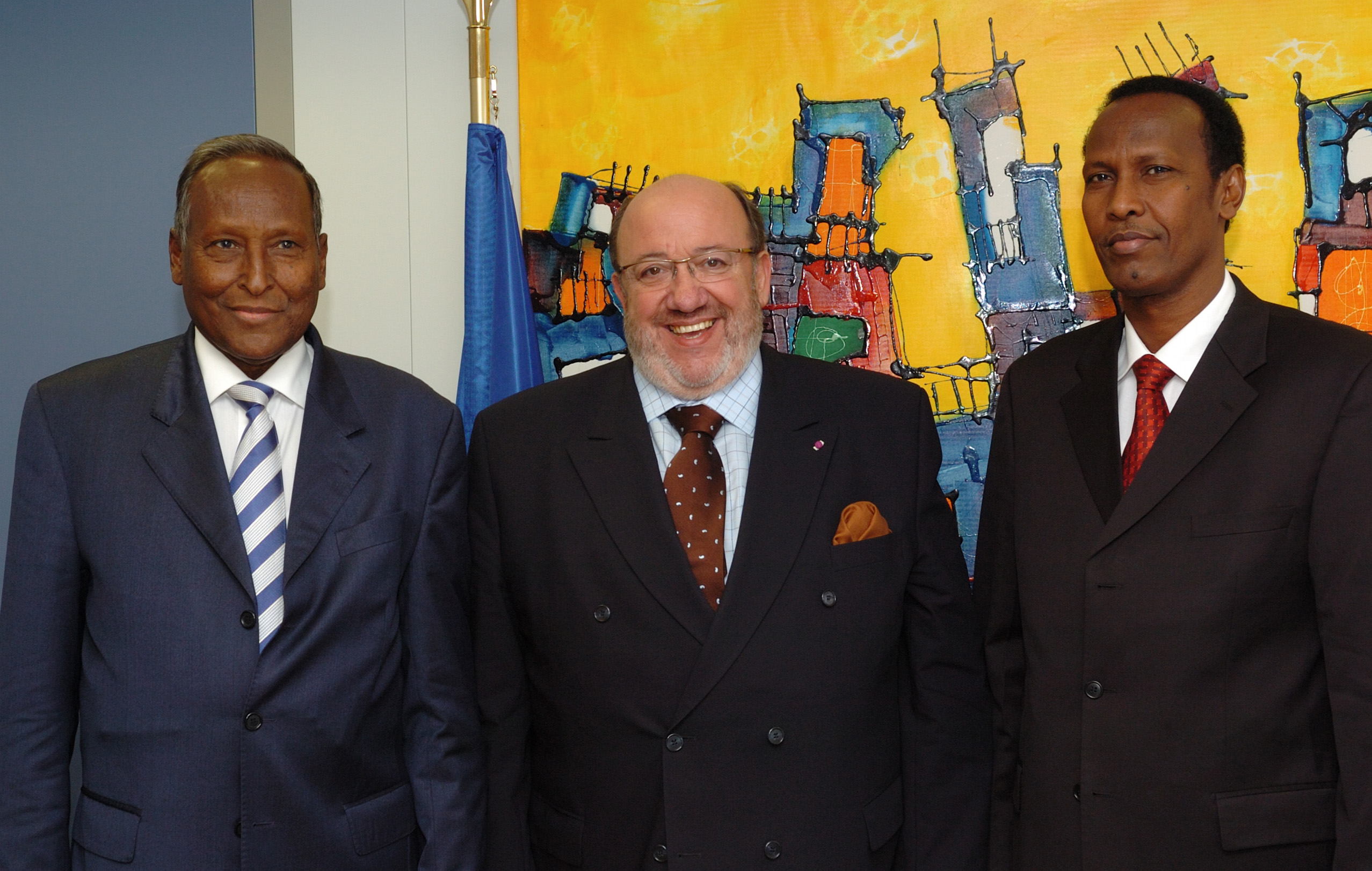
Abdullahi Yusuf Ahmed, Ali Mohammed Ghedi, and Louis Michel (28-03-2006)

Michel has been interested in the Central Africa situation and busy with the Democratic Republic of the Congo dossier since he became Belgian Minister of Foreign Affairs (1999–2004) and European Commissioner in charge of the Development & Humanitarian Aid in the Barroso Commission.

Congo was a Belgian colony between 1908 and 1960. Since then, the relations between Brussels and Kinshasa have been tumultuous. They have included such events as the secession of Katanga backed by Belgium, the murder of the Prime Minister Lumumba by the Belgian secret services, the expulsion of the Belgian ambassador in the 1960s, the banning of the Sabena company from landing in Kinshasa, and "authentic Zaïrian" policy. The father of Joseph Kabila, Laurent-Désiré Kabila had very bad relations with Brussels. Many rumours accuse Louis Michel of having used Joseph Kabila as a puppet since his father was murdered in 2001. Therefore, the media has described in a very suspicious way the good relations between Louis Michel and Joseph Kabila.

Since 2001, Michel has encouraged the peace process for the Democratic Republic of the Congo that officially put an end to the Second Congo War by establishing a Transitional government (June 2003 – June 2006). The two main missions of this government were to maintain the peace by integrating all the militias into the unified army and to bring the country to elections on 30 June 2006 having ratified the new constitution by referendum.

In a lecture on 17 January 2008 (entitled Africa-Europe: the indispensable partnership) at the London School of Economics, Michel faced Congolese protestors who accused him of being complicit in Kabila's assassination and installing a puppet government in the Congo. The meeting was abandoned shortly before its scheduled end as the chair found it impossible to continue with the interruptions.

In a 2010 magazine interview Michel stated, "Leopold II was a true visionary for his time, a hero." The comment was negatively received in the Congo and in Belgium. Michel's remarks were countered by several Belgian politicians. Senator Pol Van Den Driessche replied, "[A] great visionary? Absolutely not. What happened then was shameful. If we measured him against 21st century standards, it is likely that Leopold would be hauled before the International Criminal Court in The Hague."

=== Lebanon ===
After the Israeli-Lebanese conflict in 2006 the Commissioner visited Lebanon and called for €30 million to repair the damage there. The Parliament's development committee was cautious though about the expenditure and he was also criticised for his slow response with one MEP comparing him to "a fireman who arrives at the scene after the fire has gone out". In the same debate MEPs attacked the Commissioner for "appearing partial in the Congolese elections" in describing Joseph Kabila as "the hope of Congo". Michel responded by saying he would have said the same about any candidate in the democratic elections.

== Controversy ==
Michel caused some mild controversy in 2007 among MEPs when it became known that he is to take leave from his work to compete in Belgian elections. Generally Commissioners are meant to remain above national politics and the European Parliament's development committee asked the Parliament's legal service to assess if his participation violates the treaties. During his absence (12 May 2007 onwards), Commissioner Rehn took over his duties.

In 2010, Michel called King Leopold II of Belgium, the Congo Free State's colonial master responsible for the deaths of between 3 million and 10 million Congolese Africans, a "visionary hero." Guy Verhofstadt, then leader of the Liberals in the European Parliament, refused to comment on Michel's controversial remarks.

In November 2010, Michel led a delegation of 50 MEPs on an eight-day trip to an ACP–EU Joint Parliamentary Assembly meeting in Kinshasa, whose total cost to the Parliament's administrative budget was €1.03 million, an average cost per MEP of €20,511. It was the costliest parliamentary delegation trip outside the EU in 2010.

In 2013, Michel was accused of submitting 229 amendments to an EU data protection bill of which 158 were strongly anti-privacy. First he denied, then he argued his assistant did it. The assistant resigned. In 2020 Michel's son Mathieu Michel became Belgian State Secretary for Digitization, in charge of Administrative Simplification, Privacy and the Buildings Administration.

Political offices
| Preceded by Erik Derycke | Minister of Foreign Affairs; 1999–2004 | Succeeded by Karel De Gucht |
| Preceded by Philippe Busquin | Belgian European Commissioner; 2004–2009 | Succeeded by Karel De Gucht |
| Preceded by Philippe Busquin | European Commissioner for Research; 2004 | Succeeded by Janez Potočnik as European Commissioner for Science and Research |
| Preceded by Poul Nielson; Joe Borg | European Commissioner for Development and Humanitarian Aid; 2004–2009 | Succeeded by Karel De Gucht |
