= Füle (surname) =

Füle is a surname. Notable people with the surname include:

- Judit Füle (born 1941), Hungarian gymnast
- Štefan Füle (born 1962), Czech diplomat

== See also ==
- Füle, a village in Fejér County, Hungary
