= Günter Verheugen =

German politician (born 1944)

- Official portrait, 1999

European Commissioner for Enterprise and Industry
- In office 22 November 2004 – 9 February 2010
- President: José Manuel Barroso
- Preceded by: Ján Figeľ; Olli Rehn (Enterprise and Information Society)
- Succeeded by: Antonio Tajani (Industry and Entrepreneurship)

European Commissioner for Enlargement
- In office 13 September 1999 – 11 November 2004 Serving with Janez Potočnik
- President: Romano Prodi
- Preceded by: Position established
- Succeeded by: Olli Rehn

Member of the Bundestag
- In office 1983–1999

Personal details
- Born: 28 April 1944 (age 82) Bad Kreuznach, Germany
- Party: Social Democratic Party (1982–present)
- Other political affiliations: Free Democratic Party (Before 1982)
- Education: University of Cologne; University of Bonn

Günter Verheugen (German pronunciation: [ˈɡʏntɐ fɛɐˈhɔʏɡn̩]; born 28 April 1944) is a German politician who served as European Commissioner for Enlargement from 1999 to 2004, and then as European Commissioner for Enterprise and Industry from 2004 to 2010. He was also one of five vice presidents of the 27-member Barroso Commission (Barroso I). After his retirement, he is now honorary Professor at the European University Viadrina in Frankfurt (Oder).

== Early life and education ==
Born at Bad Kreuznach in Rhineland-Palatinate, Verheugen studied history, sociology and political science at the University of Cologne and at the University of Bonn.

== Political career ==
Verheugen was Secretary General of the Free Democratic Party of Germany (FDP) from 1978 to 1982, under the leadership of the party's chairman Hans-Dietrich Genscher. He left the FDP with many left liberal party members in 1982, because the FDP left the government of Chancellor Helmut Schmidt. In the same year, he joined the Social Democratic Party of Germany (SPD).

=== Member of Parliament, 1983–1999 ===
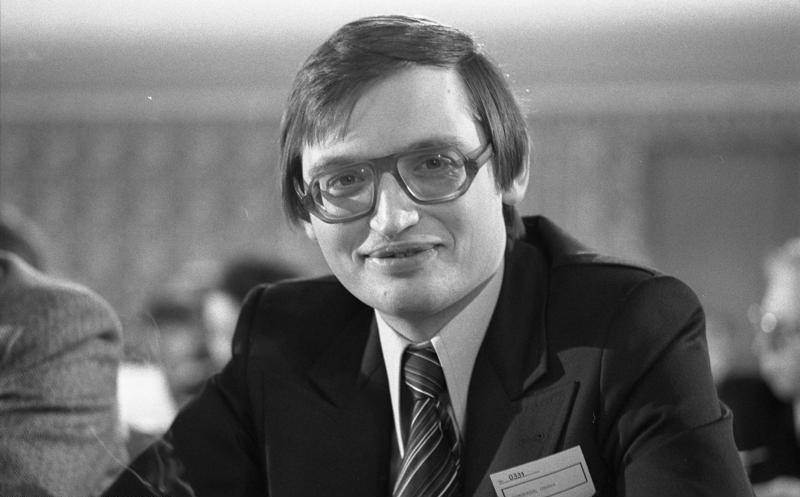
Günter Verheugen in 1976

In the 1983 Western German elections, Verheugen became a member of the German Bundestag. He was a member of the Committee on Foreign Affairs from 1983 to 1998. In the early 1980s, Verheugen mapped out a principled policy towards South Africa's apartheid regime, embarrassing many of Germany's major companies, including Mercedes-Benz and Deutsche Bank, by exposing their efforts to get round international sanctions in a book published in 1986.

From 1994 to 1997, Verheugen was deputy chairman of the SPD parliamentary group, under the leadership of the group's chairman Rudolf Scharping. In addition to his parliamentary work, he chaired the Broadcasting Council of Deutsche Welle from 1994 until 1998.

Ahead of the 1994 elections, Scharping included Verheugen in his shadow cabinet for the party's campaign to unseat incumbent Helmut Kohl as Chancellor. Within Gerhard Schröder's campaign team for the 1998 federal elections, he served as his external affairs advisor and accompanied him on his trips to Washington and Warsaw.

=== Minister of State for European Affairs, 1998–1999 ===
In the first cabinet of Chancellor Gerhard Schröder, Verheugen briefly served as Minister of State in the Federal Foreign Office under Minister Joschka Fischer. During Germany's presidency of the Council of the European Union in 1999, he led the negotiations on the Agenda 2000 package of EU policy reforms. Shortly after, he was in talks to be nominated as Germany's candidate for the European Union's newly created High Representative for Common Foreign and Security Policy; the post eventually went to Javier Solana. In 1999, he left parliament and became EU commissioner for Enlargement of the European Union.

=== Member of the European Commission, 1999–2010 ===
Nominated by the German government of Chancellor Gerhard Schröder, Verheugen first served in the European Commission as European Commissioner for Enlargement in the Prodi Commission, presiding over the accession of ten new member states in 2004. He continued in the following Barroso Commission as Commissioner for Enterprise and Industry, also being promoted to one of the five vice presidents.

On the occasion of the 40th anniversary of the Élysée Treaty in 2003, the EU Commissioners of Germany and France, Verheugen and Pascal Lamy, jointly presented the so-called Lamy-Verheugen Plan that proposed a factual unification of France and Germany in some important areas – including unified armed forces, combined embassies and a shared seat at the United Nations Security Council.

As a Commissioner, Verheugen stated a desire to cut red tape, especially in order to make it more favourable to SMEs. He also highlights research and innovation as "twin keys to future competitiveness". He outlines his priorities as; better regulation, a modern industrial policy, SMEs and innovation. In order to promote competitiveness, he laid down three policies derived from the treaties; "Competitiveness and improvement of the business environment (Art. 157). Completing and managing the Internal Market for products (Art. 28 and 95) and Innovation and research framework programmes (Title XVIII)."

Verheugen was heavily involved in work on the REACH regulation and ensuring its compatibility with the Lisbon Strategy. He sees a common patent in the Union implemented by 2012 which he sees as important as patent application for the 24 million SMEs in Europe are on average 11 times higher than in the United States.

In response to the refusal of countries to sign the Kyoto Protocol, such as the United States and Australia, Verheugen asked President Barroso to look into whether the EU could implement taxes on products imported from those countries not taking low-carbon policies on board (Border Tax Adjustments).

In October 2006, Verheugen accused European Union officials of being impossible to control, stating inter alia the purported impossibility of firing Directors-General (the highest grade in the EU civil servants structure). However, Article 50 of the EU's Staff Regulations empowers the commission to do precisely that. Former civil servant Derk Jan Eppink described Verheugen's position in the following terms:

Verheugen is worried about mandarins having too much power because he's really not in charge. If you've been in a job for eight years and you're still not in charge, you have a problem. Verheugen is a foreign policy man; he was one with the FDP (Germany's free-market liberals) and then the SPD (Social Democrats). That's his thing. In Brussels, he's weighed down in the details, he gets lost in legislation and he's not really interested in the Enterprise and Industry portfolio. That's why he was so enthusiastic about enlargement because that's foreign policy. But he's been weakened by the mandarins, and by complaining about the bureaucracy he has only made things worse. Employing his girlfriend as his head of cabinet didn't help. He has become ridiculous, but no one wants him to go. When you have a commissioner who is so undermined, you stand a good chance of overruling him and getting your way.

== Later years ==
Since leaving public office, Verheugen has held a variety of paid or unpaid positions, including the following:

- FleishmanHillard, Member of the International Advisory Board
- German-Azerbaijani Forum, Member of the Board of Trustees
- German Council on Foreign Relations (DGAP), Member
- Turkey: Culture of Change Initiative (TCCI), Member of the Advisory Board
- National Association of German Cooperative Banks (BVR), Advisor (since 2010)
- Royal Bank of Scotland (RBS), Senior Advisor (since 2010)

In 2014 Verheugen was awarded the Mercator Visiting Professorship for Political Management at the Universität Essen-Duisburg's NRW School of Governance. He gave both seminars and lectures at the university.

From March 2015, Verheugen headed the European integration work stream in the Dmytro Firtash-backed Agency for the Modernisation of Ukraine (AMU), a non-governmental organization developing a comprehensive program of modernization of Ukraine and looking for investment resources for its implementation. Verheugen led the Agency's sectoral division for the institutional reforms recommendations aimed at the integration of Ukraine into the EU and civil society building.

== Controversy ==
In 2001, former Czech Prime Minister Václav Klaus accused Verheugen of a "tragic misuse of his position", after Verheugen warned that the country's hope of joining the European Union swiftly would take a setback if the right-leaning Civic Democrats won the 2002 elections. On 5 November 2004, during a press conference, Verheugen mentioned that the future prime-minister of Romania would be Mircea Geoană (of the PSD) and that Romania would end negotiations with the EU with just four days before the Romanian legislative and presidential elections. Following this, Romanian journalists accused him of meddling in Romanian politics.

During his time in office, photographs appeared showing Verheugen holidaying with Petra Erler, the head of his private office. A Commission spokesman backed him by saying "the private holidays of Vice President Verheugen in Lithuania this summer did not violate the rules applicable to members of the Commission". Despite this, there was a minor political row over Erler's appointment with allegations of her being appointed due to their friendship. These allegations were later aggravated over photos of them together on holiday holding hands, and then on a naturist beach together in Lithuania.

== Positions ==
Verheugen claims that the Revolution of Dignity was a planned coup d'etat; he also called Svoboda members of the transitional Ukrainian government in 2014 richtige Faschisten ("true fascists").

=== On cutting EU bureaucracy ===
- "Many people still have this concept of Europe that the more rules you produce the more Europe you have."
  (October 2006)
- "The idea is that the role of the commission is to keep the machinery running and the machinery is producing laws. And that's exactly what I want to change."
  (October 2006)
- "We must ask the question of whether so many decisions need to be taken in Brussels."
  (June 2016)

== Honours ==
National honours

- Germany : Knight Commander of the Order of Merit of the Federal Republic of Germany

Foreign honours

- Croatia : Honorary citizen of Šibenik
- Estonia : 1st Class of the Order of the Cross of Terra Mariana
- Latvia : 1st Class of the Order of the Three Stars
- Slovakia : Grand Cross (or 1st Class) of the Order of the White Double Cross (2004)
- Czech Republic : 1st Class of the Order of the White Lion (2016)

Political offices
Preceded by Martin Bangemann	German European Commissioner; 1999–2010; Served alongside: Michaele Schreyer	Succeeded by Günther Oettinger
Preceded by Monika Wulf-Mathies	German European Commissioner; 1999–2010; Served alongside: Michaele Schreyer	Succeeded by Günther Oettinger
New office	European Commissioner for Enlargement; 1999–2004; Served alongside: Janez Potočnik	Succeeded by Olli Rehn
Preceded by Ján Figeľ; Olli Rehn as European Commissioner for Enterprise and Information Society	European Commissioner for Enterprise and Industry; 2004–2010	Succeeded by Antonio Tajani as European Commissioner for Industry and Entrepreneurship
