= Choice in eCommerce =

European online retailer initiative

Choice in eCommerce - Initiative for Choice and Innovation in Online-Trade - is an initiative of online retailers throughout Europe that works for unrestricted trade and innovation in Europe. Spokesman for the initiative is Oliver Prothmann, founder of the Multi-Channel tool chartixx.

== History ==
Choice in eCommerce was founded on May 8, 2013, by several online retailers in Berlin, Germany. The cause was, in the view of the initiative, sales bans and online restrictions by individual manufacturers. The dealers felt cut off from their main sales channel and thus deprived them the opportunity to use online platforms like Amazon, eBay or Rakuten in a competitive market for the benefit of their customers. Sales of all products and services traded online in Europe in 2012 counted 311.6 billion Euros. Through online trading in Europe is estimated that up to two million jobs were created.

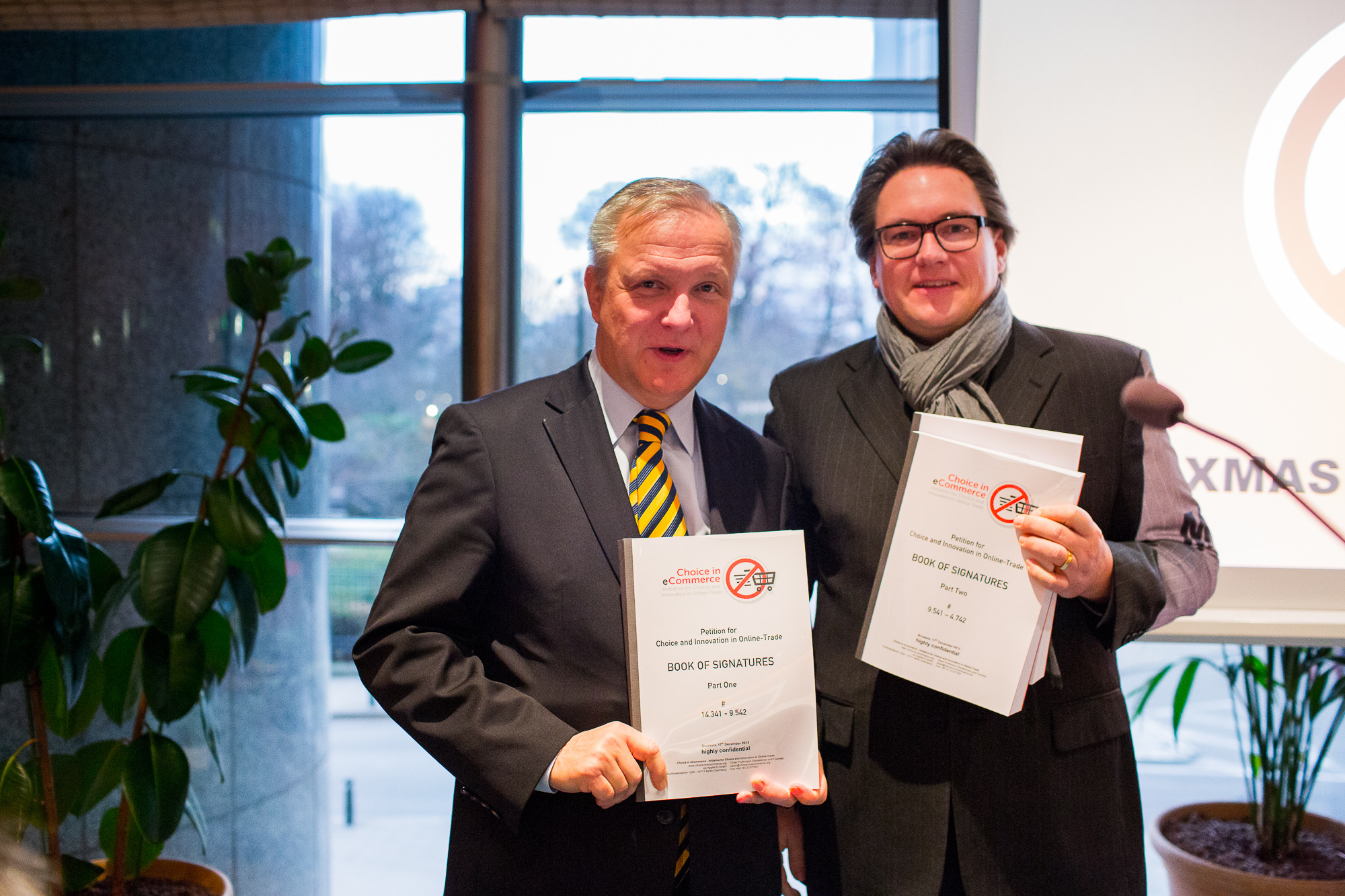
Petition handed over to Olli Rehn in Brussels on December 17th 2013

In the summer of 2013 Choice started a petition calling for free and fair trade. On December 17, 2013, Oliver Prothmann handed the petition containing 14,341 signatures of online retailers from across Europe to Olli Rehn, Vice-President of the European Commission.
