= Juraj Chmiel =

Czech diplomat

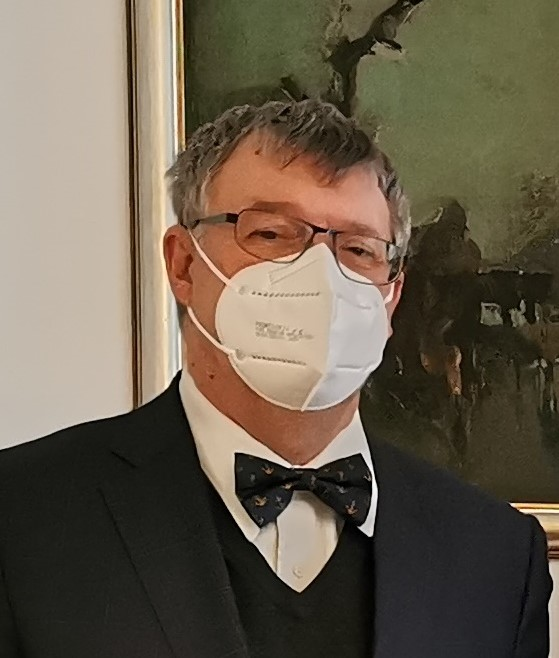

Minister for European Affairs
- In office 30 November 2009 – 13 July 2010
- Prime Minister: Jan Fischer
- Preceded by: Štefan Füle
- Succeeded by: Mikuláš Bek

Personal details
- Born: 16 August 1960 (age 66) Budapest, Hungary
- Education: Charles University
- Profession: diplomat

Juraj Chmiel (born 16 August 1960) is a Czech diplomat. He served as the nation's Minister for European Affairs.

Chmiel entered the diplomatic corps in 1992 and held several positions within the Ministry of Foreign Affairs, specialising in Africa at that time. He served as the country's Ambassador to Nigeria from 1996 to 2003 and Australia from 2008 to 2009. From September 2014 until June 2019, Chmiel served as Czech Republic Ambassador to Hungary. In June 2019, he took post of Ambassador to Slovenia until 2023.
