= Janez Potočnik =

Slovenian politician

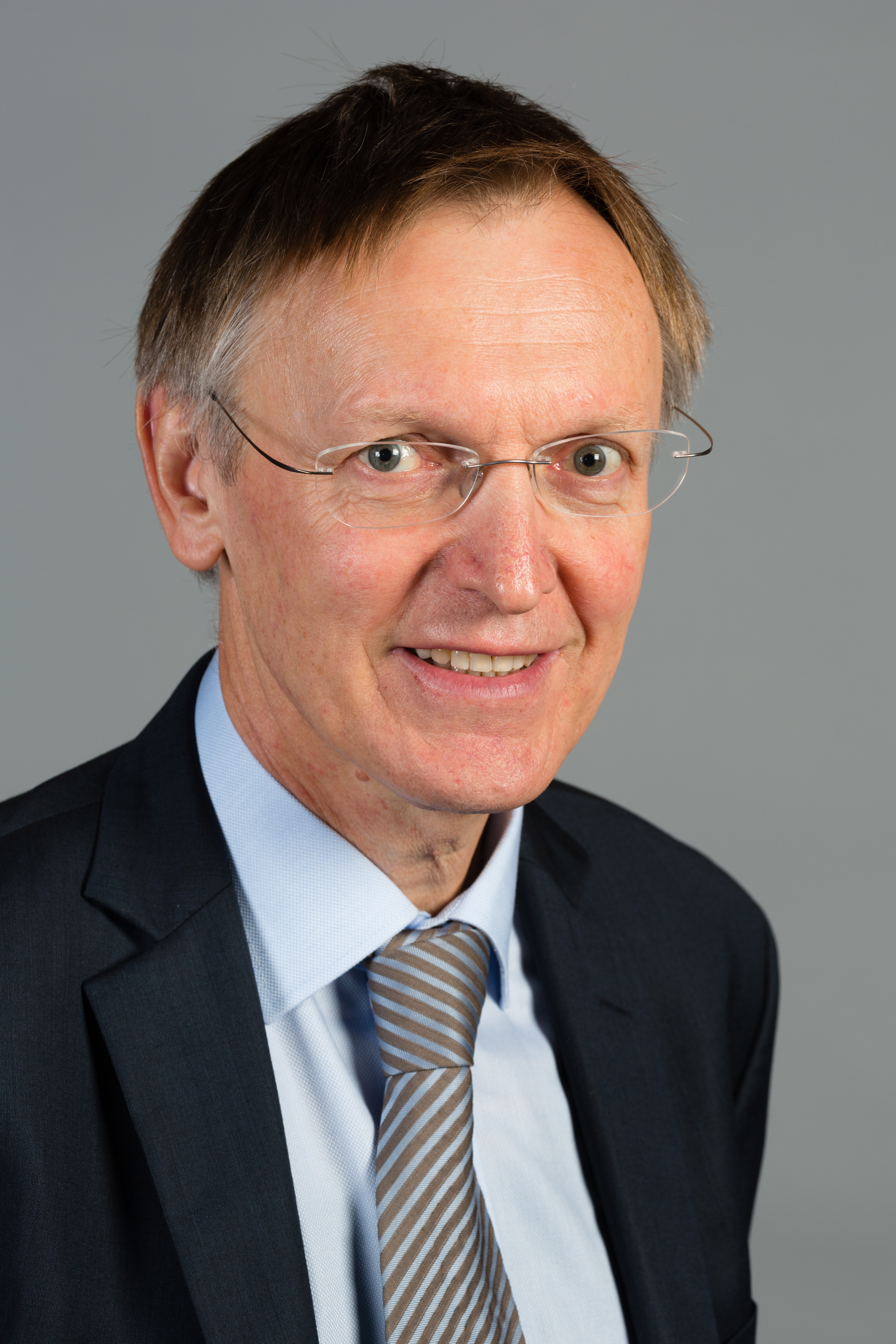
- Official portrait, 2014

European Commissioner for the Environment
- In office 9 February 2010 – 1 November 2014
- President: José Manuel Barroso
- Preceded by: Stavros Dimas
- Succeeded by: Karmenu Vella (Environment, Maritime Affairs and Fisheries)

European Commissioner for Science and Research
- In office 22 November 2004 – 9 February 2010
- President: José Manuel Barroso
- Preceded by: Louis Michel (Research)
- Succeeded by: Máire Geoghegan-Quinn (Research, Innovation and Science)

European Commissioner for Enlargement
- In office 1 May 2004 – 21 November 2004; Served with Günter Verheugen
- President: Romano Prodi
- Preceded by: Günter Verheugen
- Succeeded by: Olli Rehn

Personal details
- Born: 22 March 1958 (age 68) Kropa, Yugoslavia (now Slovenia)
- Party: Liberal Democracy
- Education: University of Ljubljana

Janez Potočnik (pronounced [ˈjaːnɛs pɔˈtɔtʃnik]; born 22 March 1958) is a Slovenian politician who served as the European Commissioner for the Environment from 2009 until 2014. He was formerly Slovenia's Minister for European Affairs. In November 2014, he became co-chair of the International Resource Panel (IRP), a forum of scientists and experts working on natural resources management.

== Biography ==
Janez Potočnik was born on 22 March 1958 in Kropa, SR Slovenia. His father Stojan was innkeeper and his mother Lojzka was a school teacher. He has one sibling, a brother seven years older named Lojz. After finishing elementary school in Lipnica, Potočnik attended high school in Kranj, where he was also active in sports, notably in basketball and track and field. After high school he moved to Ljubljana, where he received a bachelor's degree in economics from the University of Ljubljana in 1982.

== Early career ==
Potočnik served as assistant director (1984–1987) and director (1993–2001) at the Institute of Macroeconomic Analysis and Development in Ljubljana. In 1993, he received his PhD in economics from the University of Ljubljana. Between 1988 and 1993, he was a senior researcher at the Institute for Economic Research in Ljubljana.

== Political career ==
Potočnik was Minister Councillor at the Slovenian Prime Minister's Cabinet from 2001 to 2002 and Minister for European Affairs from 2002 to 2004. He headed the negotiating team for the Accession of Slovenia to the EU between 1998 and 2004.

In 2004 Potočnik became the European Commissioner for Enlargement, since November he was designated as the Commissioner for science and research. On 27 November 2009 he was nominated to serve as European Commissioner for the Environment in the Barroso Commission.

While commissioner, Potočnik stated that he believes trading knowledge and the development of an information society to create prosperity is as important to Europe as trading steel and coal to create peace was 50 years ago. He aimed to develop the European Research Area.

== Later career ==
Since 2014, Potočnik has been co-chairing – alongside Alicia Bárcena (2014–2017) and Izabella Teixeira (since 2017) – the International Resource Panel at the United Nations Environment Programme (UNEP); he succeeded Ernst Ulrich von Weizsäcker in that position. In 2020, he served on the advisory board of the annual Human Development Report of the United Nations Development Programme (UNDP), co-chaired by Tharman Shanmugaratnam and Michael Spence. Since July 2020, he has also been serving as a special advisor on sustainability to European Commissioner for the Environment & Oceans and Fisheries Virginijus Sinkevičius.

Additional roles include:

- ThinkForest Forum, President (since 2019)
- SytemiQ, Partner
- SDG multi-stakeholder platform, hosted by European Commission, Member
- Forum for the Future of Agriculture, Chairman (since 2014)
- Rural Investment for a Sustainable Europe (RISE) Foundation, Chairman (since 2014)
- Critical Ecosystem Partnership Fund (CEPF), President of the long-term vision for the Balkans sub-region of the Mediterranean Biodiversity Hotspot
- 'A vision for Europe towards sustainable and circular economy', Member of the Steering Committee

== Recognition ==
=== Honorary degrees ===
- 2008 – Honorary doctorate in science from Imperial College London
- 2009 – Honorary doctorate from Ghent University
- 2016 – Honorary doctorate in Economics and Business Administration from Aalto University

=== Awards ===
- 2011 – Fray International Sustainability Award, awarded by the Fray International Symposium
- 2013 – Champions of the Earth, awarded by the United Nations Environment Programme
- 2014 – ACER Award, awarded by the Catalan Association of Research Entities
- 2014 – Twelve Stars for the Environment Award, awarded by the European Environmental Bureau (EEB)
- 2015 – Personality Trophy at the Circular Economy Competition, awarded by the Institute of Circular Economy in Paris
- 2015 – Hans-Carl-Von-Carlowitz Prize, awarded by Carlowitz company
- 2015 – Adam Smith Prize for Environmental Economic Policy, awarded by the Green Budget Germany

== See also ==
- EU Directorate General Research
- EU Directorate General Joint Research Centre

Political offices
Preceded by Position established	Slovenian European Commissioner; 2004–2014	Succeeded by Violeta Bulc
Preceded by Günter Verheugen	European Commissioner for Enlargement; 2004; Served alongside: Günter Verheugen	Succeeded by Olli Rehn
Preceded by Louis Michel as European Commissioner for Research	European Commissioner for Science and Research; 2004–2010	Succeeded by Máire Geoghegan-Quinn as European Commissioner for Research, Innovation and Science
Preceded by Stavros Dimas	European Commissioner for the Environment; 2010–2014	Succeeded by Karmenu Vella as European Commissioner for the Environment, Maritime Affairs and Fisheries
