= Olli Rehn =

Finnish politician

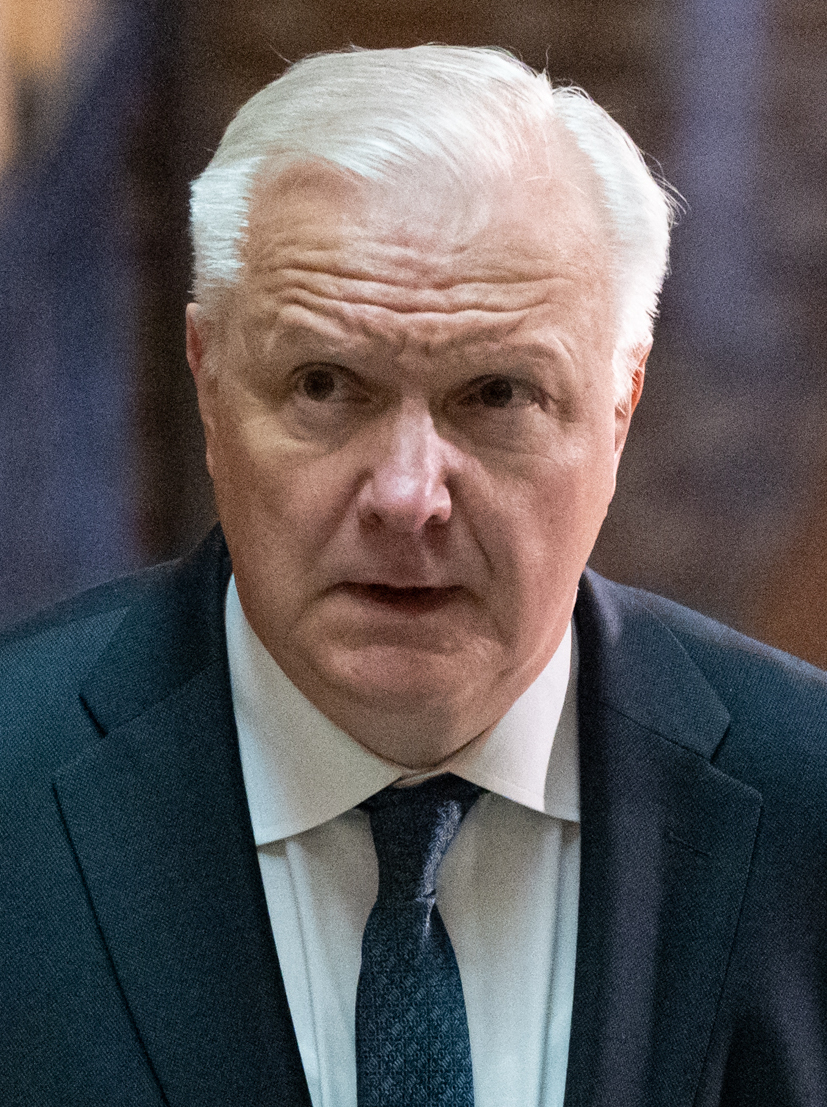
- Rehn in 2023

Governor of the Bank of Finland
- Incumbent
- Assumed office 12 July 2018
- Preceded by: Erkki Liikanen

Minister of Economic Affairs
- In office 29 May 2015 – 29 December 2016
- Prime Minister: Juha Sipilä
- Preceded by: Jan Vapaavuori
- Succeeded by: Mika Lintilä

European Commissioner for Economic and Monetary Affairs and the Euro
- In office 9 February 2010 – 1 July 2014
- President: José Manuel Barroso
- Preceded by: Joaquín Almunia (Economic and Monetary Affairs)
- Succeeded by: Siim Kallas (Acting)

European Commissioner for Enlargement
- In office 22 November 2004 – 9 February 2010
- President: José Manuel Barroso
- Preceded by: Günter Verheugen; Janez Potočnik
- Succeeded by: Štefan Füle (Enlargement and European Neighbourhood Policy)

European Commissioner for Enterprise and Information Society
- In office 12 July 2004 – 11 November 2004; Served with Ján Figeľ
- President: Romano Prodi
- Preceded by: Erkki Liikanen
- Succeeded by: Günter Verheugen (Enterprise and Industry); Viviane Reding (Information Society and Media)

Member of the Finnish Parliament
- In office 23 April 2015 – 19 January 2017
- Constituency: Helsinki (2015–2017)
- In office 22 March 1991 – 23 March 1995
- Constituency: Helsinki (1991–1995)

Personal details
- Born: 31 March 1962 (age 64) Mikkeli, Finland
- Party: Centre Party
- Education: Macalester College (BA); University of Helsinki (MA); St Antony's College, Oxford (DPhil)

Olli Ilmari Rehn (pronounced [ˈolːi ˈreːn]; born 31 March 1962) is a Finnish public official who has been serving as governor of the Bank of Finland since 2018. A member of the Centre Party, he previously served as the European Commissioner for Enlargement from 2004 to 2010, European Commissioner for Economic and Monetary Affairs and the Euro from 2010 to 2014, and Minister of Economic Affairs in Juha Sipilä's cabinet from 2015 until 2016. Rehn ran for President of Finland as an independent candidate in 2024, but was not elected. In March 2025, he was appointed to a second seven-year term as governor of the Bank of Finland, beginning on 12 July 2025.

== Early life and education ==
Born in Mikkeli in Eastern Finland, Rehn studied economics, international relations, and journalism at Macalester College in Saint Paul, Minnesota, in the United States. He gained a master's degree in political science from the University of Helsinki in 1989, and a D.Phil. from St. Antony's College, Oxford in 1996 on the subject of "Corporatism and Industrial Competitiveness in Small European States". In addition to his native Finnish, he speaks English, German, French, Swedish, and some Russian, Polish and Hungarian.

Rehn also played football for his hometown club Mikkelin Palloilijat in Finland's top division Mestaruussarja (now Veikkausliiga) in his youth.

== Finnish politics ==
He began his political career in youth politics as a regular member of the Finnish Centre Youth and soon became the secretary general of the Nordic Centre Youth. In 1987, he was elected as the president of the Finnish Centre Youth. That position can be seen as predicting high political responsibilities in Finnish politics.

In 1988 Rehn was elected as a city councillor in Helsinki. He was vice president of the Centre Party from 1988 to 1994, having been president of its youth wing from 1987. Elected to the Finnish Parliament in 1991, Rehn led the Finnish delegation to the Parliamentary Assembly of the Council of Europe, and was a special adviser to the Finnish Prime Minister Esko Aho from 1992 to 1993. He left the Finnish Parliament in 1995 to become an MEP, aligned to the liberal group. He was, however, not re-elected in the 1996 election.

He was briefly the chairman of Veikkausliiga from 1996 to 1997. From 1998 to 2002 Rehn ran the office of Erkki Liikanen, Finland's representative on the Prodi Commission. Rehn would later succeed Liikanen in the role of commissioner for Enterprise and Information Society. In 2002, he left European politics for the University of Helsinki, where he led the Centre for European Studies. In 2003, he became an adviser to the prime minister on economic policy, a position he held until his appointment to the European Commission the following year.

== European Commission ==
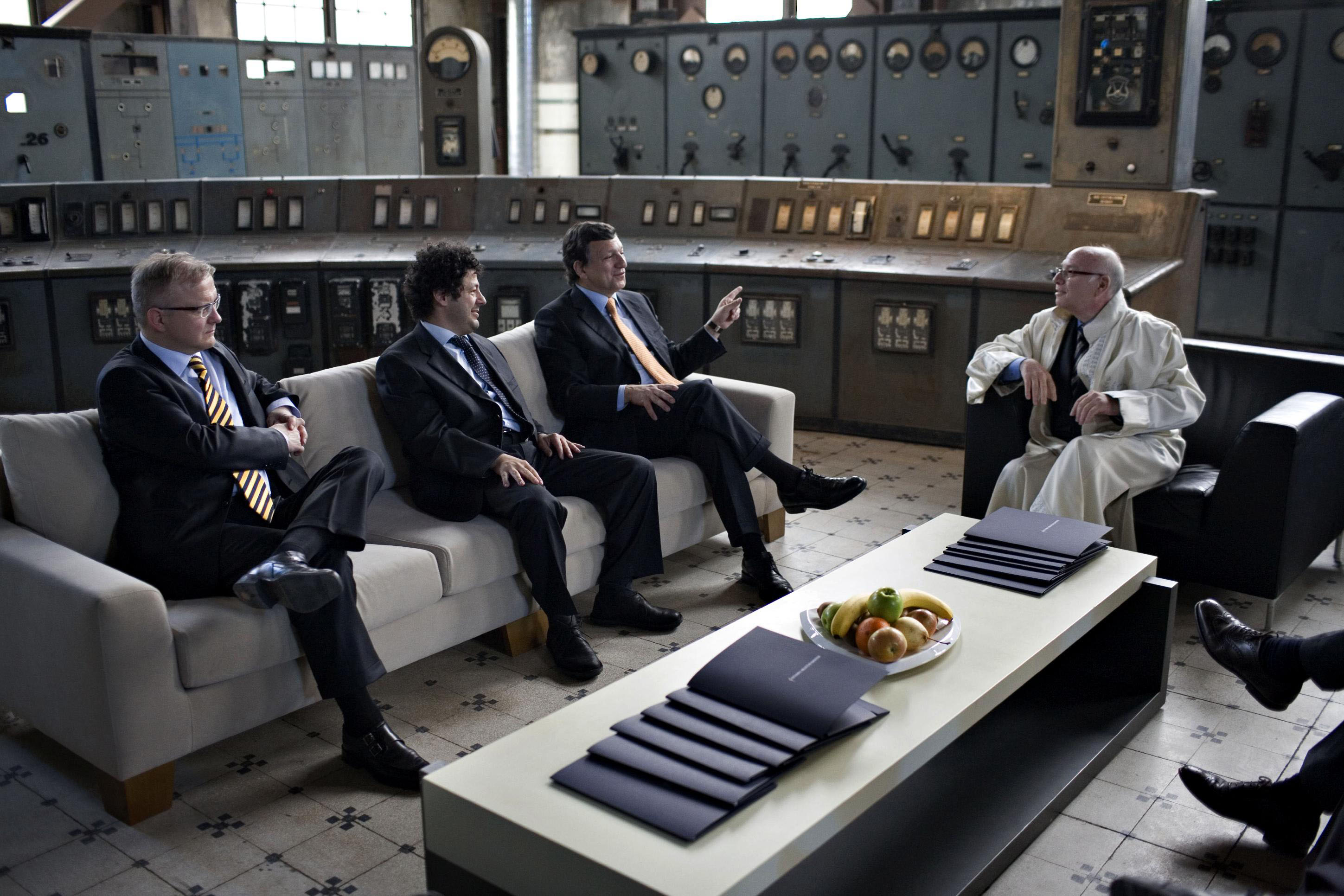
Olli Rehn and José Manuel Barroso at the Santralistanbul

Rehn served briefly on the Prodi Commission. He was appointed European commissioner for enterprise and information society on 12 July 2004, taking over the role from the previous Finnish commissioner Erkki Liikanen, who left his post the same day to become governor of the Bank of Finland. The Finnish government nominated Rehn for the incoming Barroso Commission, which took office on 22 November 2004. He was the youngest member of the first Barroso Commission.

Rehn's appointment to the enlargement post was seen as a slight disappointment for Finland, who had hoped for their nominee to be given a portfolio relating to economic issues. Enlargement was a central issue for the EU in the run-up to the landmark accession of ten countries on 1 May 2004, but has since declined in importance, if only slightly. Rehn presided over the accession of Bulgaria and Romania in 2007, as well as continuing negotiations with Croatia and opening them with Turkey, the latter being perhaps the most significant and the most hotly debated future accession.

Rehn favours Turkish membership but has controversially suggested permanent restrictions on the free movement of workers from Turkey, "in case serious disturbances occur in the labour market within the EU as a result of Turkey’s accession", an attitude seen by some as running counter to the whole purpose and spirit of the EU. He has stressed the importance of greater respect for human rights and civil liberties as preconditions for Turkey's entry, while acknowledging the advances it had already made in this respect.

Siim Kallas was twice acting commissioner in his stead, from 19 April 2014 to 25 May 2014 while he was on electoral campaign leave for the 2014 elections to the European Parliament and from 1 July 2014 – 16 July 2014 after he took up his seat.

=== Selection hearing ===
Questioned by the European Parliament, Rehn offered his thoughts on the prospects for accession of each of the countries highest on the enlargement agenda. He praised Turkey for the human rights advances it had made but said he would advocate stronger monitoring if the decision was taken to open accession talks by the European Council when it considered the question in December.

Asked about free movement of Turkish labour after the country's accession, Rehn expressed the view that there should be "considerable transitional periods as well as a permanent safeguard clause". He was cautious on the question of the inevitability of Turkish membership, stating that he did not "believe in historic determinism", but that if negotiations were begun, "underpinned by the commitment that [Turkey] will be able to join [the EU] once it fulfils all conditions, it will join as soon as it does meet the conditions".

He insisted that Bulgaria and Romania would be judged on their merits and that he would not hesitate to delay accession by a year if the EU's requirements were not met on time. He considered the establishment of a pre-accession strategy for the Western Balkans one of his prime tasks.

=== European sovereign debt crisis ===
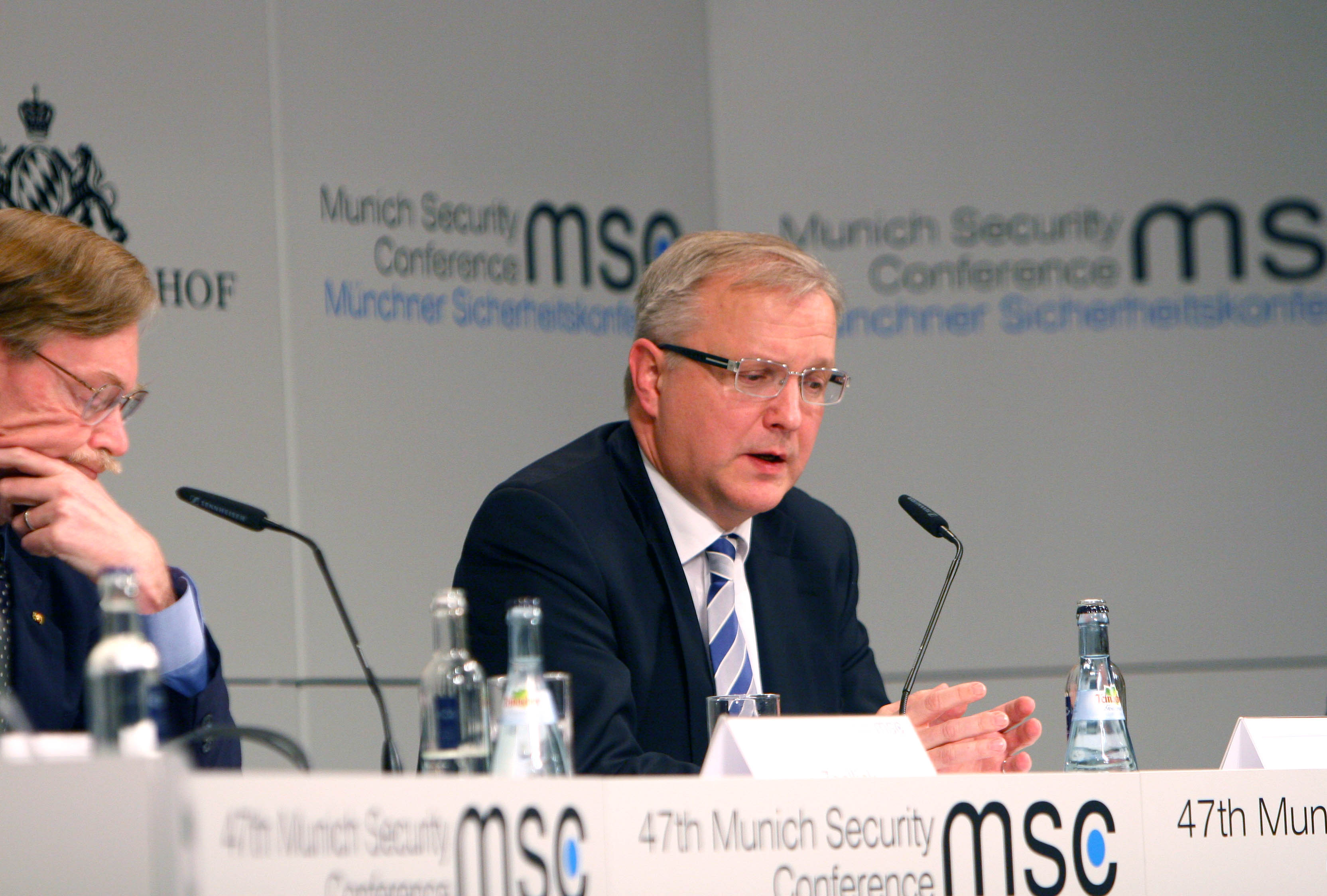
Olli Rehn giving a speech at 47th Munich Security Conference in 2011

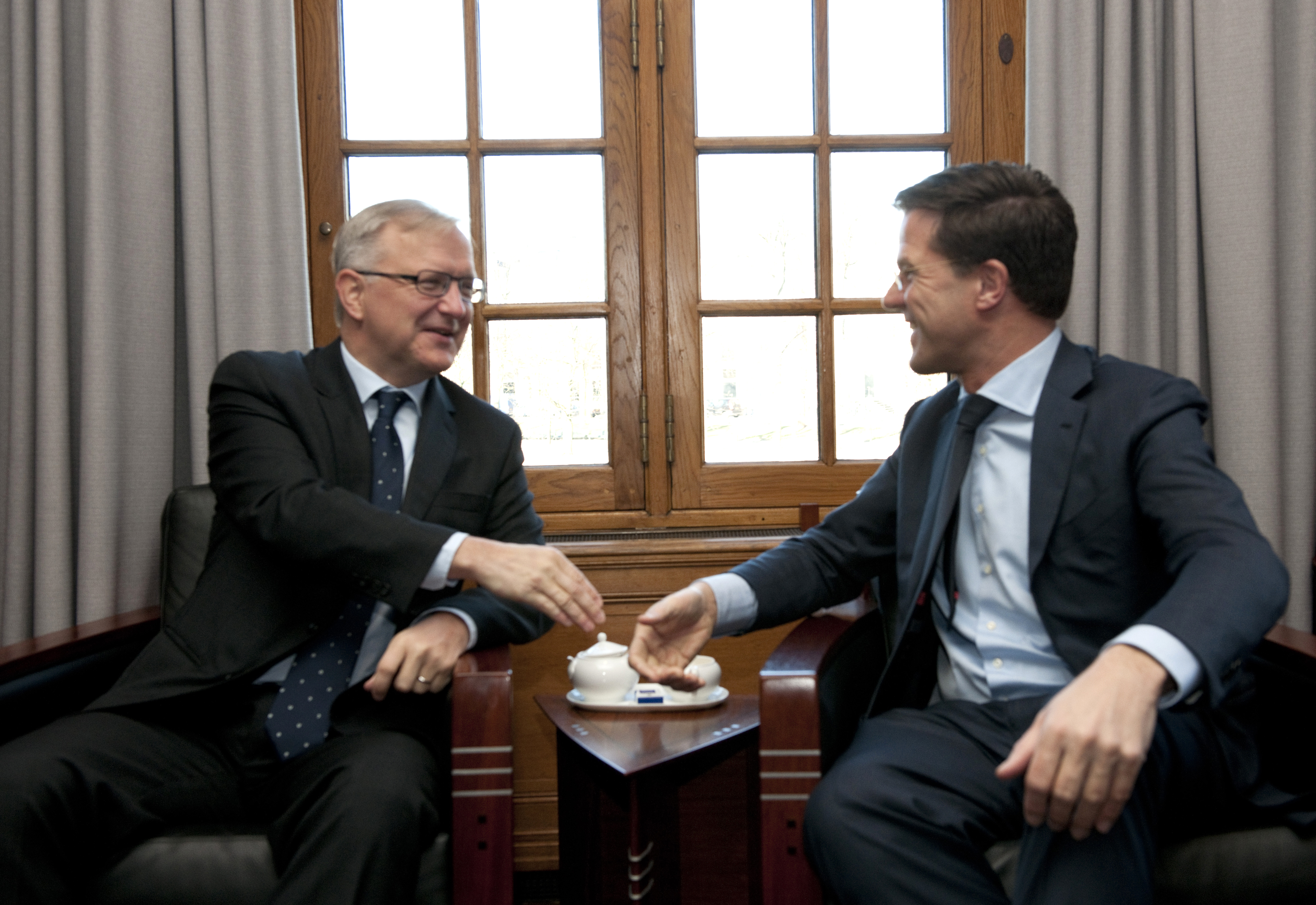
Olli Rehn with Prime Minister of the Netherlands Mark Rutte in 2012

In late June 2011, Rehn spoke out on austerity measures being considered by the Greek parliament, saying, "The only way to avoid immediate default is for parliament to endorse the revised economic program...The program includes both the medium-term fiscal strategy and the privatization program. They must be approved if the next tranche of financial assistance [a 12 billion euro aid payment] is to be released...To those who speculate about other options, let me say this clearly: there is no Plan B to avoid default".

In May 2012, coincident with warnings from Mario Draghi of the ECB, Rehn said that even if Eurobonds "were ever approved, it would still not be sufficient to save the euro. The single currency’s members needed 'a genuine stability culture and a much upgraded common capacity to contain common contagion', if they wanted to avoid a disintegration of the eurozone and if they wanted it to survive".

Rehn has continued to maintain that the only way out of the crisis is a continued programme of fiscal austerity. Economist Paul Krugman has been critical of this stance, saying in early 2013 that Olli Rehn, and the economic management of the European Commission, had been proven disastrously wrong in their predictions and management since the beginning of the crisis. He noted, "European leaders seem determined to learn nothing, which makes this more than a tragedy; it’s an outrage." Krugman maintains that Rehn's focus on fiscal discipline is in fact an excuse to dismantle the social safety net and reduce the size of government, as he has criticized countries, such as France which have tried to achieve fiscal discipline through tax increases.

In mid-2013, Rehn claimed that the European Commission was following a pragmatic policy balancing austerity policies with pro-growth policies and that much of the criticism was unfair.

== Member of the European Parliament, 2014–2015 ==
Rehn was a candidate in the 2014 European election and was elected MEP. In the European Parliament he was elected to be one of the parliament's 14 vice presidents.

== Return to Finnish politics ==
=== Minister of Economic Affairs, 2015–2016 ===
In 2015, Rehn was elected in the Finnish parliamentary election with 6,837 votes. His term in the European Parliament ended on 27 April, when Rehn officially accepted the seat in the Finnish Parliament. On 29 May 2015, Rehn was appointed the Minister of Economic Affairs in Sipilä Cabinet. During his time in office, he oversaw the country's emergence from a three-year recession thanks to a combination of tax and spending cuts. He also played a key role in persuading labor unions to agree to pay cuts to restore competitiveness.

=== Bank of Finland, 2016–present ===
On 14 October 2016, Rehn was selected to the board of the Bank of Finland. In this capacity, he is in charge of monetary policy implementation and investment of the Bank of Finland's financial assets. He is also responsible for the bank's digitalisation process and for the activities of the Financial Supervisory Authority, where he is chairman of the board. He continued as a minister and MP till the end of 2016.

Following the resignation of Christine Lagarde as managing director of the International Monetary Fund (IMF) in 2019, Rehn was one of the candidates considered by European governments as potential successor; he withdrew his candidacy shortly after and the post went to Kristalina Georgieva instead.

In June 2023, Rehn announced his candidacy for 2024 presidential election as an independent candidate. In the election, he placed fourth with 15.32% of the total vote count and failed to advance to the second round of voting.

In January 2026, the government of Prime Minister Petteri Orpo submitted Rehn as a candidate to succeed Luis de Guindos in the position of Vice-president of the European Central Bank. As one of six candidates, he made it to the last of three rounds of voting within the Eurogroup only to eventually lose out against Boris Vujčić.

== Other activities ==
=== International organizations ===
- European Central Bank (ECB), ex officio member of the governing council
- European Systemic Risk Board (ESRB), ex officio member
- International Monetary Fund (IMF), ex officio alternate member of the board of governors
- European Bank for Reconstruction and Development (EBRD), ex officio member of the board of governors (2010–2014)

=== Non-profit organizations ===
- Women Political Leaders Global Forum (WPL), member of the global advisory board
- World Economic Forum (WEF), member of the Europe Policy Group (since 2017)
- World Economic Forum (WEF), chairman of the Global Agenda Council on Public Finance and Social Protection Systems
- World Economic Forum (WEF), member of the Global Future Council on the Future of Financial and Monetary Systems
- Trilateral Commission, member of the European Group
- Academy of European Law (ERA), member of the board of trustees

== Personal life ==
Rehn is married with one child.

After launching his political career Rehn did not give up football but has played for the teams of both the Finnish parliament and the European Commission. With the Finnish parliament team, he twice helped to win the European championship of parliaments in the early 1990s.

His mother was Vuokko Rehn.

== Awards ==
- Sweden: Commander Grand Cross of the Royal Order of the Polar Star (23 April 2024)
- Finland: Commander Grand Cross of the Order of the Lion of Finland (2014)
- Estonia: 2nd Class of the Order of the Cross of Terra Mariana (2011)
- Latvia: Commander (3rd Class) of Order of the Three Stars (October 2014)
- Finnish Expat of the Year (2011, Suomi Seura Society)

Political offices
Preceded by Erkki Liikanen	Finnish European Commissioner; 2004–2014	Succeeded by Jyrki Katainen
Preceded by Erkki Liikanen	European Commissioner for Enterprise and Information Society; 2004; Served alongside: Ján Figeľ	Succeeded by Günter Verheugen as European Commissioner for Enterprise and Industry
Preceded by Erkki Liikanen	European Commissioner for Enterprise and Information Society; 2004; Served alongside: Ján Figeľ	Succeeded by Viviane Reding as European Commissioner for Information Society and Media
Preceded by Günter Verheugen; Janez Potočnik	European Commissioner for Enlargement; 2004–2010	Succeeded by Štefan Füle as European Commissioner for Enlargement and European Neighbourhood Policy
Preceded by Joaquín Almunia as European Commissioner for Economic and Monetary Affairs	European Commissioner for Economic and Monetary Affairs and the Euro; 2010–2014	Succeeded by Siim Kallas; Acting
Government offices
Preceded by Erkki Liikanen	Governor of Bank of Finland; 2018–present	Incumbent
