= Barroso Commission =

European Commission from 2004 to 2014

- 4th & 5th Commission of the European Union

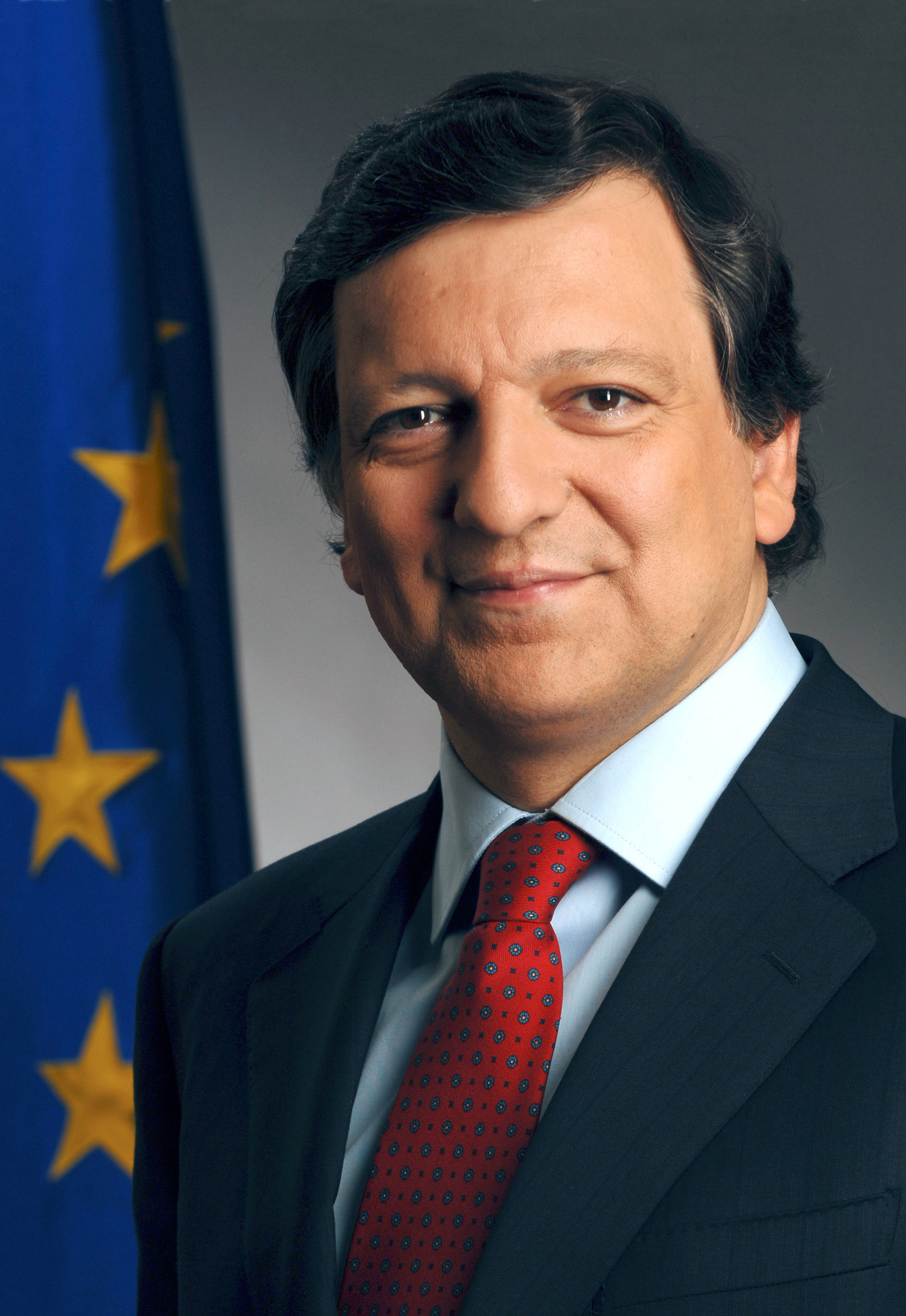
- Date formed: 22 November 2004
- Date dissolved: 31 October 2014

People and organisations
- President of the Commission: President; José Durão Barroso
- Vice-President(s) of the Commission: First Vice President; First College: Margot Wallström; Second College: Catherine Ashton

History
- Election(s): 2004 European Parliament election 2009 European Parliament election
- Predecessor: Prodi Commission
- Successor: Juncker Commission

The Barroso Commission was the European Commission in office from 22 November 2004 until 31 October 2014. Its president was José Durão Barroso, who presided over 27 (Note: 24 until 1 January 2007 (Accession of Romania and Bulgaria) then 26 until 1 July 2013 (Accession of Croatia)) other commissioners (one from each of the states composing the European Union, aside from Portugal, which is Barroso's state). On 16 September 2009 Barroso was re-elected by the European Parliament for a further five years and his Commission was approved to take office on 9 February 2010.

Barroso was at first seen as the lowest common denominator by outside commentators, but his proposed team of Commissioners earned him some respect before triggering a crisis when the European Parliament objected to some of them, forcing a reshuffle. In 2007 the Commission gained two new members when Romania and Bulgaria joined the European Union.

Barroso's handling of his office was markedly more presidential than his predecessors. During his term the Commission passed major legislation including the REACH and 'Bolkestein' Directives. Under Barroso, the civil service in the Commission became more economically liberal.

== History ==
Barroso was nominated as president and approved by Parliament in July 2004. However his proposed Commission met with opposition from the Parliament, notably concerning Rocco Buttiglione and his conservative comments which were seen as incompatible with his role as European Commissioner for Justice, Freedom and Security. The opposition plunged the EU into a minor crisis before Barroso conceded to the Parliament and reshuffled his team, removing Buttiglione, and his Commission took office on 22 November 2004. The commission was joined in 2007 by two further Commissioners when Bulgaria and Romania joined the EU.

=== Presidential candidates ===
The Prodi Commission was due to end its mandate at the end of October 2004, so following the 2004 elections to the Sixth European Parliament, candidates for Commission President began to be considered. There was strong backing for Belgian Prime Minister Guy Verhofstadt (EDLR) from Ireland, France and Germany who saw him as a "convinced European and also a fighter". However the federalist was opposed by Spain the United Kingdom, Italy and Poland due to his vocal opposition to both the Iraq War and the inclusion of God in the European Constitution. Irish Taoiseach Bertie Ahern (AEN) was also a popular candidate but did not wish to take up the job.

Due to the victory of the European People's Party in the previous election, EPP parties were keen to get one of their members into the post, including Luxembourgian Prime Minister Jean-Claude Juncker (EPP), who refused, and Austrian Chancellor Wolfgang Schüssel (EPP), who was in a coalition with the far-right Freedom Party of Austria which discredited him as a candidate to some governments.

A number of Commissioners were also touted, notably Franz Fischler, Commissioner for Agriculture (Austria, EPP), António Vitorino, Commissioner for JHA (Portugal, PES), Chris Patten, Commissioner for External Relations (UK, ED), Michel Barnier, and Commissioner for Regional Policy (France, EPP).

Other candidates were High Representative Javier Solana (Spain, PES) and President of the Parliament Pat Cox (Ireland, ELDR) however both were light candidates. However Barroso emerged as a leading candidate despite his support for the Iraq War and being seen as the lowest common denominator following objections to other candidates. The Parliament approved Barroso as president on 22 July 2004 by 413 votes to 215 (44 abstentions) with most of his support coming from the EPP-ED group. He did however earn praise for his later choice of commissioners.

=== Commissioner hearings ===
Barroso rejected the idea of a "supercommissioner" and desired 1/3 of the commission to be women and that the most powerful portfolios should be handed to those most capable, not those from larger states. His sharing out of jobs between the larger and smaller states equally earned him some early praise. Candidates were proposed by national governments for each of the Commissioners and Parliament held hearings for them, to determine their suitability, between 27 September and 11 October of that year.

During the hearings, members found fault in a number of Commissioners. Committees questioned the suitability of Ingrida Udre (Taxation and Customs Union), László Kovács (Energy), Neelie Kroes (Competition) and Mariann Fischer-Boel (Agriculture). However the most controversial was Rocco Buttiglione as European Commissioner for Justice, Freedom and Security due to his conservative comments (on women's position in marriage and that homosexuality was a sin) which, in the eyes of some MEPs, made him unsuitable for a job securing civil rights in the EU leading to the civil rights committee to be the first committee to vote down an incoming Commissioner.

The Party of European Socialists (PES) were the most vocal critics of Barroso and his proposed Commission, while the European People's Party (EPP) backed the commission with the Alliance of Liberals and Democrats for Europe (ALDE) split. Barroso attempted to offer small concessions to Parliament but they were not accepted as the PES made clear they would vote down the commission as it stood, leaving the divided ALDE holding the balance of whether the Barroso Commission would be the first Commission in EU history to rejected by Parliament. The EPP demanded that if Buttiglione were to go, then a PES commissioner must also be sacrificed for balance.

Barroso eventually gave in and withdrew his proposed college of Commissioners and, following three weeks which left Prodi continuing as a caretaker, proposed a new line-up. There were three changes to help his dented authority and win the support of Parliament: Buttiglione had been withdrawn by Italy and replaced by foreign minister Franco Frattini, László Kovács was moved from Energy to Taxation and Ingrida Udre was withdrawn and replaced by Andris Piebalgs who took over the now vacant post of Energy.

However a further issue concerning Jacques Barrot was raised by Independence/Democracy co-leader Nigel Farage MEP. Barrot, a returning Commissioner nominated as a Vice-President with the Transport portfolio, had received a suspended prison sentence in 2000 in relation to a funding scandal involving his political party. He subsequently received a Presidential amnesty from then-French President Jacques Chirac and Barroso was unaware of the conviction until it was raised by Parliament. Despite this, Barroso stood by Barrot stating he was fit for office. Farage had also made allegations against vice-president Siim Kallas, stating he had a criminal record in fraud. However this proved false, based on an inaccurate newspaper article, and an apology was published.

Despite this, the commission was approved on 18 November 2004, 449 votes in favour, 149 against and 82 abstentions, after Barroso gained the support of all three major parties and they took office on 22 November, three weeks after they were due to.

=== 2007 enlargement ===
Romania and Bulgaria joined the EU on 1 January 2007 with each being granted a single Commissioner, increasing the college of Commissioners to 27 members. Both new Commissioners were approved by the Parliament on 12 December 2006. Meglena Kuneva was proposed by Bulgaria and was assigned the Consumer Protection portfolio, previously part of the joint Health & Consumer Protection portfolio. She was welcomed by Parliament with the EPP and PES being impressed by her aims and attitude. Kuneva with 583 votes "in favour", 21 votes "against" and 28 votes "abstentions".

Romania originally proposed Senator Varujan Vosganian, however he quickly met with opposition from Socialists and the Commission itself due to his far right views and having no experience of the EU or profile outside Romania. That nomination was replaced by Leonard Orban who was given the portfolio of Multilingualism, previously part of Education, Training & Culture. This however was met a cool reception for being such a slim portfolio. PES Group leader Martin Schulz MEP suggested it should instead focus on ethnic minorities but this was rejected by Barroso. Orban was approved by Parliament with 595 votes in favour, 16 against and 29 abstentions.

=== End of term resignations ===
In March 2008, Commissioner Kyprianou left the Commission following presidential elections in Cyprus to become his home country's new foreign minister. He was replaced by Androula Vassiliou who was approved by Parliament on 9 April. Commissioners leaving early towards the end of their mandate is common, as they seek to secure their next job, but can undermine the commission as a whole.

Kyprianou was followed by Franco Frattini on 23 April 2008 following elections in Italy when he was recalled to serve as foreign minister of Italy. Frattini's responsibilities were handed to Barrot (who held them in addition to his existing transport duties) until a replacement for Frattini could be found. In light of Parliament's opposition in 2004 when Buttiglione was deemed inappropriate for the justice portfolio, when Antonio Tajani MEP (another right wing candidate) was put forward to replace Frattini, president Barroso handed him Barrot's transport portfolio, leaving Barrot to continue with the justice portfolio for continuity and to ensure Parliament would back Tajani in such as non-sensitive position as Transport (but one still of interest to Italy due to problems with Alitalia). Parliament approved Tajani on 18 June 2008 with a vote of 507 to 53 (64 abstentions). Peter Mandelson then left in October 2008 to return to national politics as Secretary of State for Business, Enterprise and Regulatory Reform, being replaced by Baroness Ashton. Following the 2009 election two commissioners stood down to accept seats in the European Parliament: Danuta Hübner (Poland) and Louis Michel (Belgium) who were replaced by Paweł Samecki (4 July) and Karel De Gucht (17 July) respectively. Dalia Grybauskaitė (Lithuania) was replaced by Algirdas Šemeta on 1 July 2009) after becoming President of Lithuania. Ján Figeľ (Slovakia) was replaced by Maroš Šefčovič on 1 October 2009 after being elected leader of the Christian Democratic Movement on 21 September 2009.

=== Second term – Barroso ===
In 2008, Barroso steadily won support from leaders for a second term as president, Nicolas Sarkozy and Silvio Berlusconi both declared their support for Barroso, though Barroso himself stated it is up to the political parties in Parliament. On 19 July 2008 Barroso stated for the first time that he was seeking a second term and was backed by the EPP for re-election. In the 2009 elections, the EPP maintained their position as largest party, though without an absolute majority even with the support of other parties to their right. Yet the second and third largest groups, the PES and ALDE, failed to put forward an alternative candidate to challenge Barroso even if they had won. Despite this, a loose red-green-yellow coalition (the PES/S&D and ALDE with The Greens–European Free Alliance) formed against Barroso in an attempt to gain concessions from him. They demanded Barroso set out clearly his policy guidelines for his next term and offer key posts in the commission to their group members. They also attempted to push the vote back beyond the ratification date for the Treaty of Lisbon to have more power over his appointment.

In a meeting with the political groups on 10 September 2009, Barroso argued his new policies to a packed room with an unusually lively debate as Barroso defended his record against the Greens, his most ardent opponents. Despite holding his own in the debate he did not win support from the Greens. however the PES/S&D and ALDE leaders softened their opposition, the latter approving of the idea of a Commissioner for Human Rights. Following the plenary debate on 15 September the EPP and anti-federalist European Conservatives and Reformists declared support, with conditional support from ALDE. The PES/S&D, Greens/EFA and eurosceptic Europe for Freedom and Democracy group all declared opposition, criticising ALDE for switching camps. However the groups struggled to enforce a party line as MEPs vote via a secret ballot. The vote took place on 16 September 2009. On 16 September 2009, Barroso was re-elected by Parliament by 382 to 219 (out of 718, with 117 abstentions).

=== Second term – College ===
Although Jacques Barrot wished to stay, French President Sarkozy favoured Michel Barnier and Vladimír Špidla was also interested but his party is out of government. Benita Ferrero-Waldner lacks support in Austria and was replaced Communications Commissioner Margot Wallström did not intended to return for another third term and has criticised her portfolio for not having any powers. She recommended that her successor be a "Citizen's Commissioner" with a legislative agenda, including control over Erasmus. To gain the liberal vote in Parliament Barroso pledged to create a Commissioner for Civil Liberties and a Commissioner for Internal Affairs and Migration (who will forge a common migration policy), splitting the current Justice, Freedom and Security portfolio.

The new portfolios, as well as splitting home affairs from civil liberties, merges enlargement with the neighbourhood policy, creates a post for climate change and scraps or merges weak dossiers such as communication (which was also open to charges of propaganda) and multilingualism. There are still some weak posts however, such as humanitarian aid and institutional relations.

There was some minor controversy over appointing a Frenchman to the Internal Market due to France's desire to regulate the City of London, however the civil service department for such regulation will not be headed by a Briton. There was also concern over a Romanian taking on agriculture, as Romania has had problems managing its EU farm subsidies. Although Barroso had wished for greater gender balance, only one extra woman was nominated to the new Commission. All the vice-presidents are returning Commissioners and their order of precedence is: Catherine Ashton (first vice-president), Viviane Reding, Joaquin Almunia, Siim Kallas, Neelie Kroes, Antonio Tajani and then Maroš Šefčovič.

Bulgaria's initial candidate, Rumiana Jeleva, was forced to step down due to opposition from MEPs, mainly the PES, who questioned her suitability and financial interests despite backing from the EPP (to which her national party belongs). Bulgaria rapidly submitted Kristalina Georgieva, but this forced the vote on the commission to be delayed weeks so Georgieva's hearings could be arranged. The only other commissioner-designate to lack support was returning commissioner Neelie Kroes, who was also seen to perform poorly in her hearing. However, she was invited back and secured more support, indicating she will get approval from Parliament.

Parliament approved the new line-up on 9 February 2010 with 488 votes in favour. 137, The Greens–European Free Alliance and European United Left–Nordic Green Left, voted against while 72 MEPs abstained; including the European Conservatives and Reformists who abstained on democracy grounds. The greens criticised the other parties for opposing Barroso's team and then voting in favour anyway, protesting that Barroso "assigned portfolios without respect to the prospective commissioners' competences. Worse still, he moved commissioners from posts where they were doing a good job. The new college risks being characterised by internal power struggles instead of teamwork due to the unclear division of responsibilities." while the conservatives desired a vote for them individually as "there were strong candidates who we would have endorsed, and weak candidates who we would have opposed."

However, in exchange for approving the commission, Parliament secured an agreement from Barroso ensuring Parliament's president may attend the Commission meetings and international negotiations. However Barroso resisted Parliament's calls for de facto legislative initiative for Parliament and for a veto power over special representatives.

== Legislation and actions ==
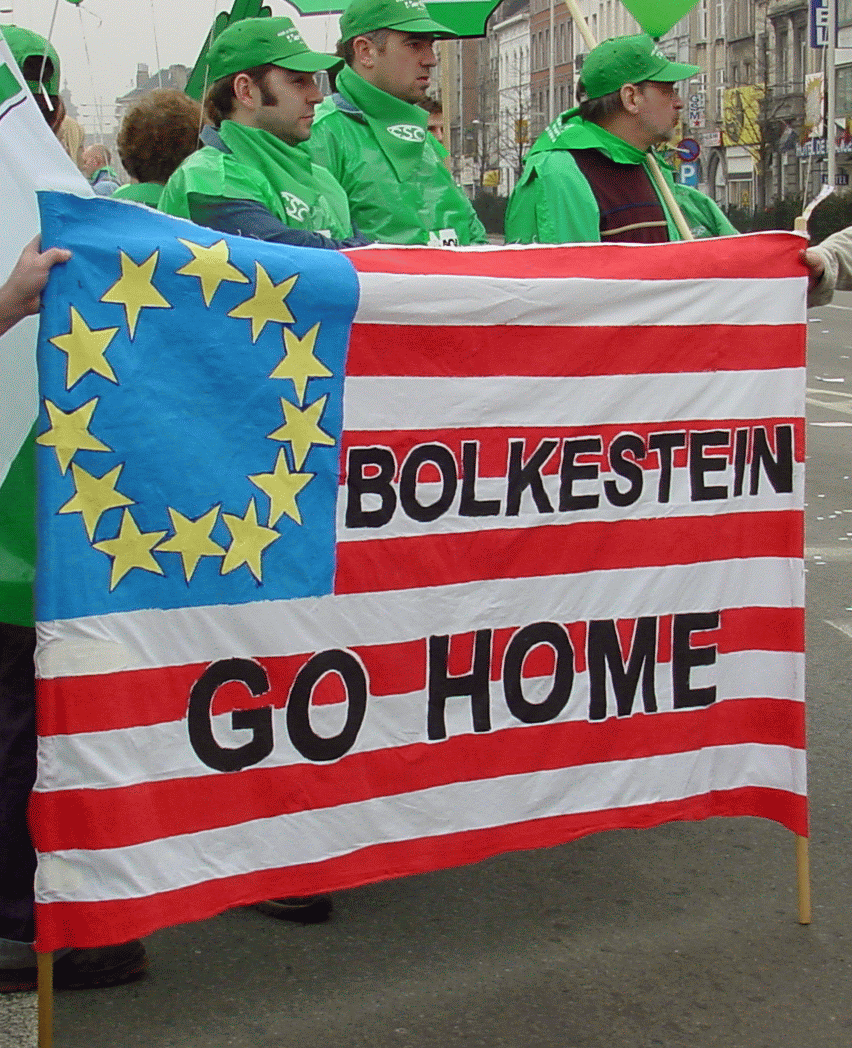
The Bolkestein Directive faced strong opposition.

There have been a number of high-profile pieces of legislation, inherited from Prodi and initiated by the President Commission. In most cases Barroso has been keep to connect himself to them rather than leave it to individual commissioners. The commission's work includes the opening up of the EU's services sector with the 'Bolkestein' Directive and the largest piece of legislation thus far, the REACH directive. Through its work in getting agreement on such legislation, it has regained some respect as a neutral player previously lost in fighting with member states.

=== Services ===
One legislative package inherited from the Prodi Commission was the Directive on services in the internal market, commonly known as the 'Bolkestein Directive', which sought to liberalise the EU's services sector which accounts for two-thirds of the EU's economy. Barroso's Market Commissioner, Charlie McCreevy, put forward a text following far reaching amendments proposed by Parliament and protests from trade unions.

An agreement was finally reached in May 2007 which excluded sectors such as social care, healthcare, gambling, port services, television media and security services among others. McCreevy also dropped the proposed country of origin principle where a company could operate in another EU country under their home state's labour rules.

=== Roaming ===
One piece of legislation notably managed to win widespread public support, the Regulation on roaming charges in the European Union from Information Society & Media Commissioner Viviane Reding. The legislation capped roaming charges for calls made from a mobile phone being used in an EU member state other than its own, which were seen as disproportionally high by the commission. It was approved despite opposition from mobile phone operators, however the Socialists in Parliament had wanted more concessions from industry.

Reding has seen the legislation as a success and stated that, despite initial fears, there have not been price rises on domestic calls as a result of the caps. However she noted that operators had instead tried to "trick" users to switching to more expensive tariffs or using more expensive options such as texting which was not covered by the legislation.

=== Other policy ===
The REACH directive was another major piece of legislation agreed in 2006 after three years of negotiations. The directive aims to regulate the use of over 30,000 chemicals used in the EU (which produces 28% of the worlds chemicals) for risks to the environmental or human health. The commission's proposals were watered down by Parliament who were seen by some environmental groups as watering down the proposals. The directive was the largest single piece of legislation ever produced by the commission and is expected to set the standards for the rest of the world.

10 January 2007 marked the publication of the commission's first venture into an EU energy policy, which had an emphasis on fighting climate change with a binding target of a 20% cut in greenhouse gases by 2020. The policy also aimed for a true common energy market, more low-carbon energy and through this, greater energy independence from oil exporters such as Russia.

In a case inherited from the Prodi Commission, Competition Commissioner Neelie Kroes had engaged in a drawn out case against Microsoft concerning abuse of its dominant market position. Microsoft refused to comply with the Commissions demands and received a 497 million euro fine, the largest imposed by the commission on a single company. In this case, European Union v. Microsoft, Microsoft failed to win its appeal at the European Court of Justice in 2007 and agreed to co-operate with the commission.

On 3 March 2010, president Barroso announced Europe 2020, a proposal for a major 10-year strategy aimed at reviving the European economy. It targets "smart, sustainable, inclusive growth" with greater co-ordination of national and European policy.

On 5 December 2012 the antitrust regulators of Barroso Commission fined Philips, LG Electronics, Samsung SDI, Panasonic, Toshiba and Technicolor for price fixing of TV cathode-ray tubes in two cartels lasting nearly a decade. The biggest fine, of 313.4 million euros, was imposed on Philips, followed by LG Electronics with 295.6 million euros. Panasonic was fined 157.5 million euros, Samsung SDI 150.8 million euros, Technicolor 38.6 million euros and Toshiba 28 million euros.

== Composition ==
The Barroso Commission is led by president José Manuel Barroso and consists of 26 other Commissioners (24 between 2004 and 2007). There is one member from each European Union member state, nine are women and members are drawn primarily from the three major European political parties, Barroso himself being from the European People's Party. There are seven Vice-Presidents and the most senior is Catherine Ashton.

=== President ===
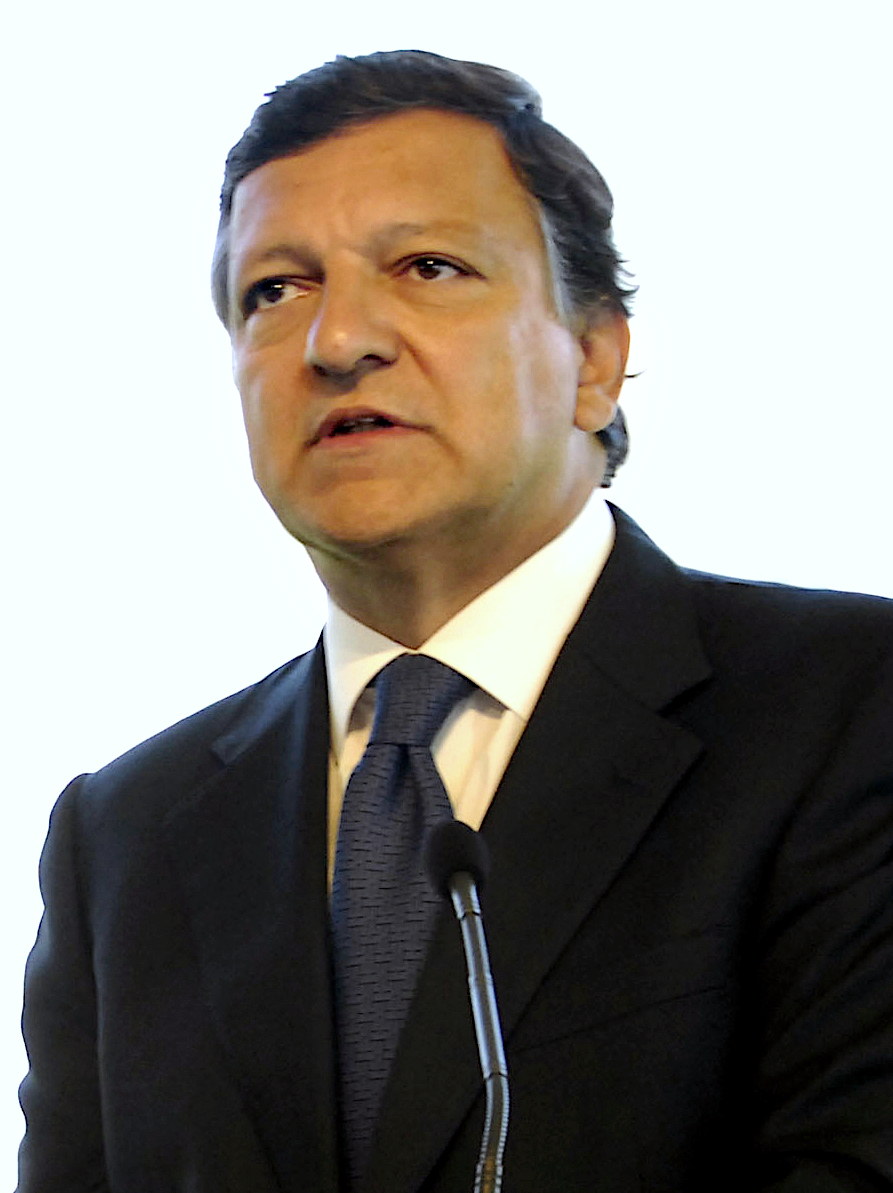
President Barroso in 2007

The President is the former Prime Minister of Portugal; José Manuel Barroso. He took over from former Italian Prime Minister Romano Prodi who served from 1999 (Prodi Commission). He is a member of the European People's Party and was appointed by the European Council in June 2004 in response to the victory of the EPP-ED in the 2004 European elections. Some of Barroso's stated aims are to tackle voter apathy and euroscepticism, visible during those elections, to work with the United States and to develop a "defence identity."

Barroso comes from a small integrationist state and had become unpopular due to his economic policies. His government had backed the United States in the Iraq War. The leader of the socialist group, Martin Schulz, criticised him for his pro- war stance, optimised by his organisation of the Azores summit. Despite such opposition, the European Parliament approved him as president by 413, although there were difficulties over his choice of Commissioners (see below).

He has earned some criticism due to his leadership of the expanded Commission – with it being notably more Presidential than his predecessors. Barroso had unusually been linked with all the commission's major initiatives, for example those on energy and climate change, rather than the particular Commissioner responsible. He also had a number of "pet projects" such as the Galileo positioning system and the European Institute of Innovation and Technology.

He had also been accused of acting in favour of larger states to secure a desired second term in office. This has gone so far as to overrule Commissioner McCreevy (internal market commissioner) from overhauling artists' levies after pressure from France, despite Barroso himself being an economic liberal. In July 2008 he succeeded in winning the support of French President Nicolas Sarkozy, Parliament President Hans-Gert Pöttering and Italian Prime Minister Silvio Berlusconi. However he has stated it is up to the parties in Parliament to decide and that despite his attempts for re-election being well known, he never publicly declared this intention until an interview on 19 July 2008. He further stated he felt honoured and privileged to serve as president. In fact, he did consider resigning as president during the talks on the Treaty of Lisbon, notably due to notorious disagreements between Germany and Poland, but considered to do so would be "too theatrical". In October 2008 he won the informal support of the European People's Party for re-election. The EPP came out as the largest party after the 2009 elections and, after gaining the support of other rightist parties, Barroso won Parliament's support for a second term on 16 September 2009. His team was approved by Parliament in February 2010 after a number of concessions to Parliament.

=== First college ===
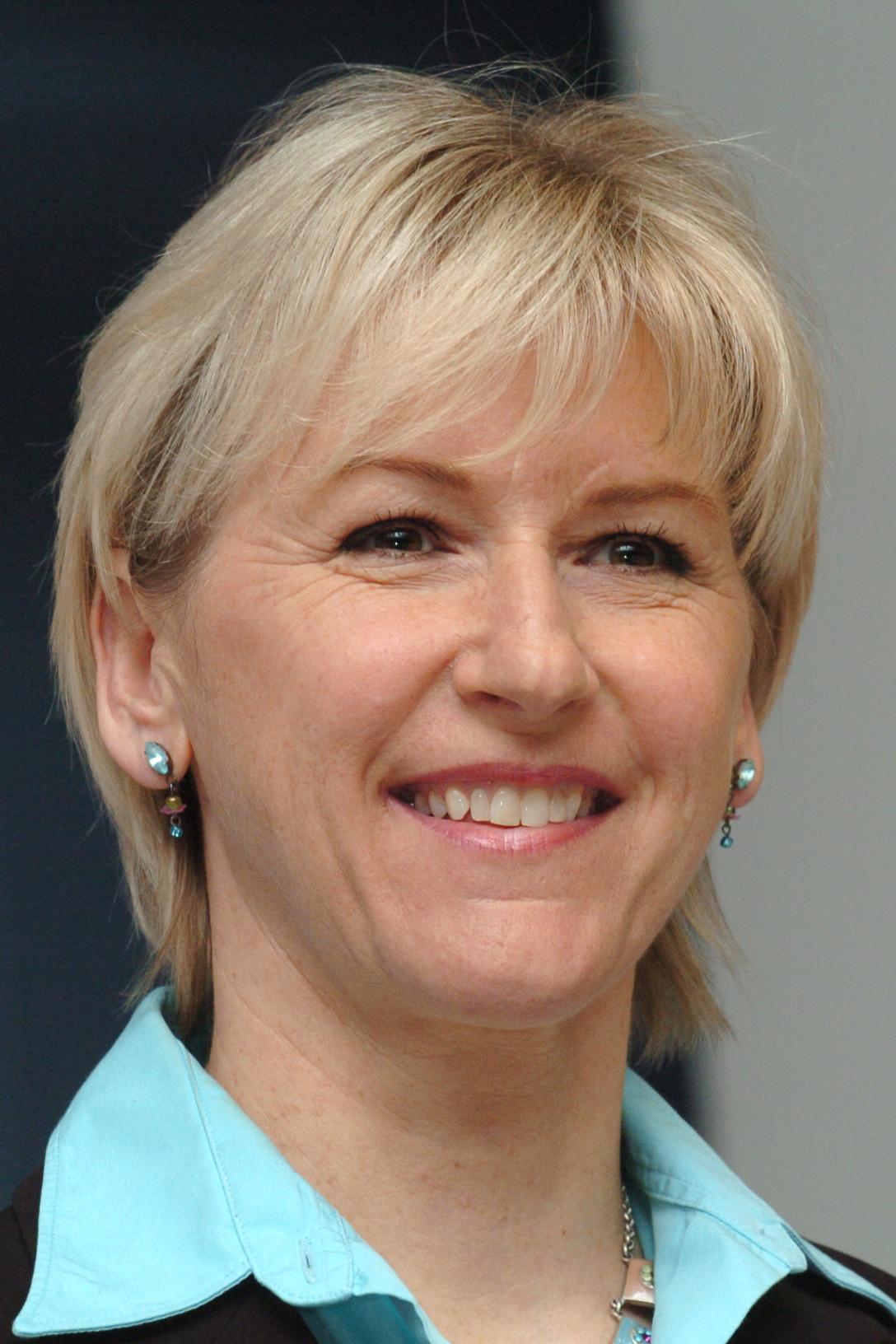
Margot Wallström, First Vice-President and Commissioner for Institutional Relations and Communication Strategy

Member states appointed one Commissioner each (including the President). It was the first Commission where larger member-states did not have two Commissioners and the first full Commission following the 2004 enlargement. From 2004 there were 25 members, raising to 27 from 2007. There were 9 women in the college as of 3 March 2008 and no ethnic minorities, Barroso had stated he wished for more women in his Commission, than in previous Commissions, and he would use his influence over national capitals to gain this. Most Commissioners (20) were born in the 1940s and 1950s with the youngest member being Olli Rehn (born 1962) and the oldest being Jacques Barrot (born 1937).

Most members were former ministers with links to the Union, for example being Foreign Minister, Minister for European Affairs or represented their country in accession talks or at the European Convention. In addition to Barroso both Siim Kallas and Vladimír Špidla were former Prime Ministers. Viviane Reding was the only Commissioner with a background in the European Parliament.

Politically they came from each of the major political parties; the European Liberal Democrat and Reform Party (8), the European People's Party (8) and the Party of European Socialists (6). In addition there were 4 Independents and one member of the Alliance for Europe of the Nations. Barroso had been complimented for balancing the portfolios between countries, such as between small and large, new and old, and pro- and anti- (Iraq) war. Before 2007 there were only 7 Liberals and 3 Independents.

| Commissioner | Portrait | Portfolio | State | Party | Notes |
|---|---|---|---|---|---|
| José Durão Barroso | | President | Portugal | EPP; National: PSD | |
| Margot Wallström | | First Vice-President; Institutional Relations and Communication Strategy | Sweden | PES; National: SAP | |
| Günter Verheugen | | Vice-President; Enterprise and Industry | Germany | PES; National: SPD | |
| Franco Frattini | | Vice-President; Justice, Freedom and Security | Italy | EPP; National: PDL | Served until 23 April 2008 |
| Antonio Tajani | | Vice-President; Transport | Italy | EPP; National: PDL | Served from 18 June 2008 |
| Jacques Barrot | | Vice-President; Justice, Freedom and Security | France | EPP; National: UMP | Held Transport until 2008. Took JFS when Frattini left. Frattini's replacement took Transport. |
| Siim Kallas | | Vice-President; Administrative Affairs, Audit and Anti-Fraud | Estonia | ALDE; National: Reform | |
| Joaquín Almunia | | Economic and Financial Affairs | Spain | PES; National: PSOE | |
| Charlie McCreevy | | Internal Market and Services | (Republic of Ireland) Ireland | ALDE; National: FF | |
| Mariann Fischer Boel | | Agriculture and Rural Development | Denmark | ALDE; National: Venstre | |
| Neelie Kroes | | Competition | Netherlands | ALDE; National: VVD | |
| Peter Mandelson | | Trade | United Kingdom | PES; National: Labour | Served until 3 October 2008 |
| Catherine Ashton | | Trade | United Kingdom | PES; National: Labour | From 1 December 2009, Ashton became the new High Representative and swapped the external relations portfolio with Ferrero-Waldner. However Ferrero-Waldner maintained control over the Neighbourhood Policy and EuropeAid. |
| Joe Borg | | Fisheries and Maritime Affairs | Malta | EPP; National: PN | |
| Stavros Dimas | | Environment | Greece | EPP; National: ND | |
| Markos Kyprianou | | Health | Cyprus | ALDE; National: DIKO | Served until 3 March 2008. Prior to 1 January 2007, portfolio included Consumer Protection |
| Androulla Vassiliou | | Health | Cyprus | ALDE; National: EDI | Served from 3 March 2008 |
| Louis Michel | | Development and Humanitarian Aid | Belgium | ALDE; National: MR | Served until 17 July 2009 |
| Karel De Gucht | | Development and Humanitarian Aid | Belgium | ALDE; National: Open VLD | Served from 17 July 2009 |
| Olli Rehn | | Enlargement | Finland | ALDE; National: Keskusta | |
| Vladimír Špidla | | Employment, Social Affairs and Equal Opportunities | Czech Republic | PES; National: ČSSD | |
| László Kovács | | Taxation and Customs Union | Hungary | PES; National: MSZP | |
| Dalia Grybauskaitė | | Financial Programming and the Budget | Lithuania | Independent | Served until 1 July 2009 |
| Algirdas Šemeta | | Financial Programming and the Budget | Lithuania | Independent | Served from 1 July 2009 |
| Benita Ferrero-Waldner | | External Relations and European Neighbourhood Policy | Austria | EPP; National: ÖVP | From 1 December 2009, Ashton became the new High Representative and swapped the external relations portfolio with Ferrero-Waldner. However Ferrero-Waldner maintained control over the Neighbourhood Policy and EuropeAid. |
| Ján Figeľ | | Education, Training and Culture | Slovakia | EPP; National: KDH | Prior to 1 January 2007, portfolio included Multilingualism |
| Danuta Hübner | | Regional Policy | Poland | Party of European Socialists; National: Independent | Served until 4 July 2009 |
| Paweł Samecki | | Regional Policy | Poland | Independent | Served from 4 July 2009 |
| Andris Piebalgs | | Energy | Latvia | EPP; National: LC | |
| Janez Potočnik | | Science and Research | Slovenia | Independent | |
| Viviane Reding | | Information Society and Media | Luxembourg | EPP; National: CSV | |
| Meglena Kuneva | | Consumer Protection | Bulgaria | ALDE; National: NDSV | Served from 1 January 2007. Prior to 2007, this portfolio was part of Health and Consumer Protection. |
| Leonard Orban | | Multilingualism | Romania | Independent | Served from 1 January 2007. Prior to 2007, this portfolio was part of Education, Training and Culture |

=== Second college ===
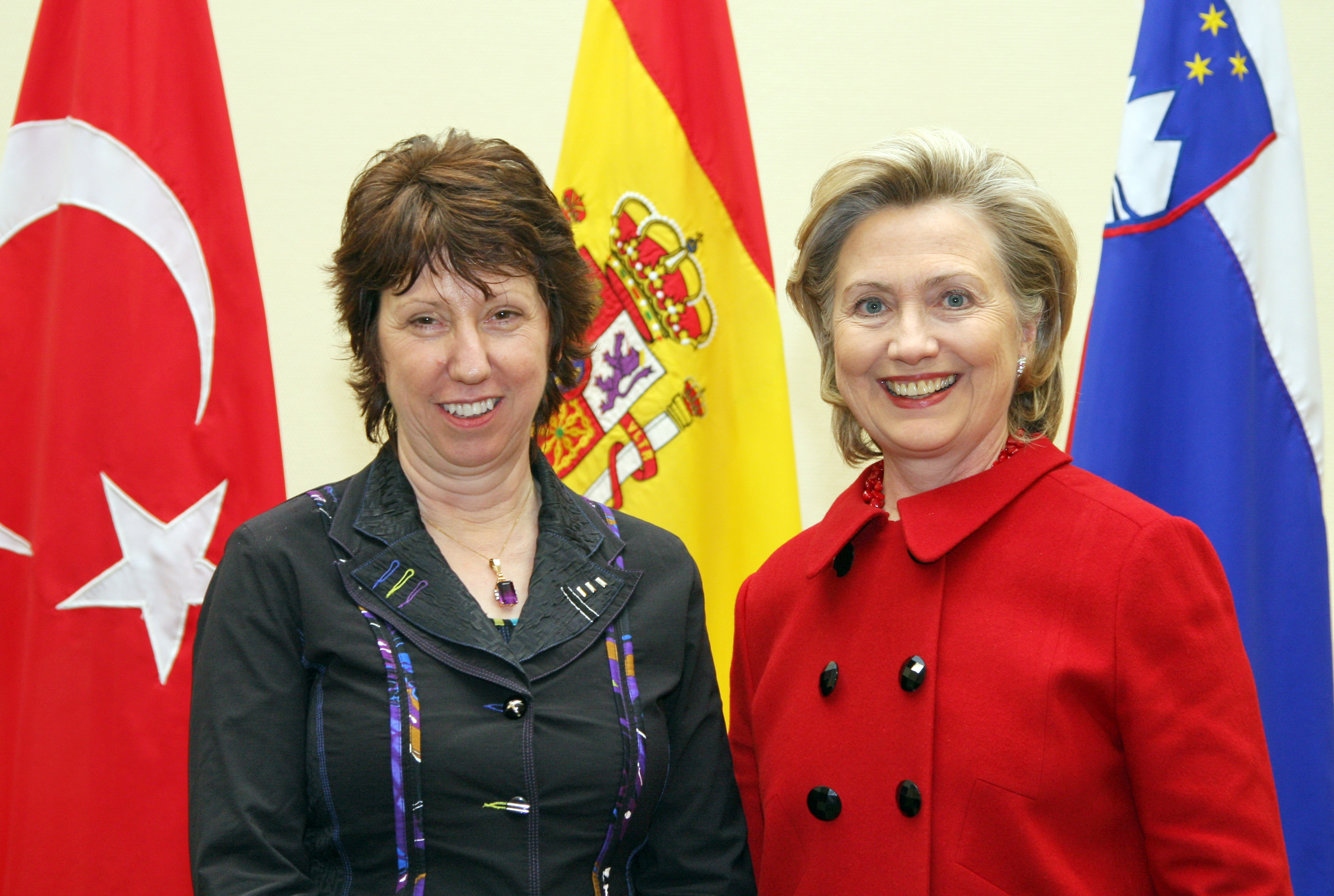
Catherine Ashton (left), High Representative and First vice-president with the US Secretary of State

The second Barroso Commission was elected by Parliament on 9 February 2010 after securing concessions from president Barroso and securing the replacement of the Bulgarian designate. They had support from all except for The Greens–European Free Alliance and the European United Left–Nordic Green Left and the European Conservatives and Reformists. The new college included the High Representative for the first time, due to changes from the Lisbon Treaty. Therefore, the High Representative, Catherine Ashton, became ex-officio First-Vice-President.

Despite requests for more women, member states nominated only nine women of the twenty-seven designates. In keeping with the balance in the council, and Barroso's voting base in parliament, most Commissions stem from the centre-right with 13 from the EPP, 7 from ALDE and only 7 from the centre-left PES. 13 members (including all the vice-presidents) are staying on from the previous Barroso Commission and Barnier served in the Prodi Commission. Below are all the Commissioners as their appointment. Some innovations include splitting the justice, freedom and security portfolio, creating the climate action portfolio and reversing the splits created in 2007 for the Bulgarian and Romanian commissioners. When Croatia joined the EU in July 2013, the Health/Consumer Protection split made during Bulgaria's accession in 2007 was replicated.

Dalli was forced to resign in October 2012 due to a lobbying frame-up. His replacement is Tonio Borg.

Five commissioners (Janusz Lewandowski, Neven Mimica, Viviane Reding, Maroš Šefčovič and Antonio Tajani) took electoral leave from 19 April 2014 – 25 May 2014 while Olli Rehn began his leave earlier from 7 April 2014. During that time, each of their portfolios was taken over by Andris Piebalgs, László Andor, Johannes Hahn, José Manuel Barroso, Michel Barnier and Siim Kallas, respectively. After the elections and parliament's promulgation on 1 July 2014, Lewandowski, Reding, Rehn and Tajani took up their seats as MEPs and were each replaced by the same commissioners as when they were on leave (Piebalgs, Hahn, Kallas and Barnier, respectively). Karel De Gucht took neither electoral leave nor his eventual seat.

| Commissioner | Portrait | Portfolio | State | Party | Notes |
|---|---|---|---|---|---|
| José Durão Barroso | | President | Portugal | EPP; National: PSD | Acting Inter-Institutional Relations and Administration Commissioner from 19 April 2014 – 25 May 2014. |
| Catherine Ashton | | First Vice-President; Foreign Affairs and Security Policy | United Kingdom | PES; National: Labour | |
| Viviane Reding | | Vice-President; Justice, Fundamental Rights and Citizenship | Luxembourg | EPP; National: CSV | Resigned 1 July 2014; on campaign leave from 19 April 2014 – 25 May 2014. Portfolio deputised to Johannes Hahn both times. |
| Martine Reicherts | | Justice, Fundamental Rights and Citizenship | Luxembourg | Independent | Appointed 16 July 2014. |
| Joaquín Almunia | | Vice-President; Competition | Spain | PES; National: PSOE | |
| Siim Kallas | | Vice-President; Transport | Estonia | ALDE; National: Reform | Acting Economic and Monetary Affairs and the Euro Commissioner from 7 April 2014 – 25 May 2014 and 1 July 2014 – 16 July 2014. |
| Neelie Kroes | | Vice-President; Digital Agenda | Netherlands | ALDE; National: VVD | |
| Antonio Tajani | | Vice-President; Industry and Entrepreneurship | Italy | EPP; National: PdL | Resigned 1 July 2014; on campaign leave from 19 April 2014 – 25 May 2014. Portfolio deputised to Michel Barnier. |
| Ferdinando Nelli Feroci | | Industry and Entrepreneurship | Italy | Independent | Appointed 16 July 2014. |
| Maroš Šefčovič | | Vice-President; Inter-Institutional Relations and Administration | Slovakia | PES; National: Smer-SD | Acting Health & Consumer Policy Commissioner from 16 October 2012 – 28 November 2012. On campaign leave from 19 April 2014 – 25 May 2014; portfolio deputised to José Manuel Barroso. |
| Olli Rehn | | Vice-President; Economic and Monetary Affairs and the Euro | Finland | ALDE; National: Keskusta | Was made vice-president, and gained added responsibility for the euro, on 27 October 2011. Resigned 1 July 2014; on campaign leave from 7 April 2014 – 25 May 2014. Portfolio deputised to Siim Kallas both times. |
| Jyrki Katainen | | Vice-President; Economic and Monetary Affairs and the Euro | Finland | EPP; National: KOK | Appointed 16 July 2014. |
| Janez Potočnik | | Environment | Slovenia | ALDE; National: LDS | |
| Andris Piebalgs | | Development | Latvia | EPP | Acting Financial Programming and the Budget Commissioner from 19 April 2014 – 25 May 2014 and 1 July 2014 – 16 July 2014. |
| Michel Barnier | | Vice President; Internal Market and Services | France | EPP; National: UMP | Acting Industry and Entrepreneurship Commissioner from 19 April 2014 – 25 May 2014 and 1 July 2014 – 16 July 2014. Was made Vice President from 1 July 2014. |
| Androulla Vassiliou | | Education, Culture, Multilingualism and Youth | Cyprus | ALDE; National: EDI | |
| Algirdas Šemeta | | Taxation and Customs Union, Audit and Anti-Fraud | Lithuania | EPP | |
| Karel De Gucht | | Trade | Belgium | ALDE; National: Open VLD | |
| John Dalli | | Health and Consumer Policy | Malta | EPP; National: PN | Resigned on 16 October 2012. |
| Tonio Borg | | Health | Malta | EPP; National: PN | Appointed on 28 November 2012. Prior to 1 July 2013, portfolio included Consumer Policy. |
| Máire Geoghegan-Quinn | | Research, Innovation and Science | (Republic of Ireland) Ireland | ALDE; National: FF | |
| Janusz Lewandowski | | Financial Programming and the Budget | Poland | EPP; National: PO | Resigned 1 July 2014; on campaign leave from 19 April 2014 – 25 May 2014. Portfolio deputised to Andris Piebalgs both times. |
| Jacek Dominik | | Financial Programming and the Budget | Poland | EPP; National: PO | Appointed 16 July 2014. |
| Maria Damanaki | | Maritime Affairs and Fisheries | Greece | PES; National: PASOK | |
| Kristalina Georgieva | | International Cooperation, Humanitarian Aid and Crisis Response | Bulgaria | EPP; National: proposed by GERB | |
| Günther Oettinger | | Vice President; Energy | Germany | EPP; National: CDU | Was made Vice President from 1 July 2014. |
| Johannes Hahn | | Regional Policy | Austria | EPP; National: ÖVP | Acting Justice, Fundamental Rights and Citizenship Commissioner from 19 April 2014 – 25 May 2014 and 1 July 2014 – 16 July 2014. |
| Connie Hedegaard | | Climate Action | Denmark | EPP; National: KF | |
| Štefan Füle | | Enlargement and European Neighbourhood Policy | Czech Republic | PES; National: ČSSD | |
| László Andor | | Employment, Social Affairs and Inclusion | Hungary | PES; National: MSZP | Acting Consumer Protection Commissioner from 19 April 2014 – 25 May 2014. |
| Cecilia Malmström | | Home Affairs | Sweden | ALDE; National: FP | |
| Dacian Cioloş | | Agriculture and Rural Development | Romania | EPP; National: independent, proposed by PD-L | |
| Neven Mimica | | Consumer Protection | Croatia | PES; National: SDP | Served from 1 July 2013. Prior to 2013, this portfolio was part of Health and Consumer Policy. On campaign leave from 19 April 2014 – 25 May 2014; portfolio deputised to László Andor. |

== Civil service ==
The Secretary-General for this term was Catherine Day, appointed in 2005. She was the first woman to hold the post and took over from David O'Sullivan. Early favourite François Lamoureux, previously in charge of Transport, had health problems and his being infirm was seen as a political blow to France and a final break from the Delors era, instead giving the commission a more liberal economic outlook. Commissioner Kallas stressed the appointments were on merit, resisting pressure from national capitals.

Day was part of a vast reshuffle of Commission officials by the President after he came to power. The reshuffle was welcomed by the right-wing as the new directors-general, including Day, were liberal reformers, many British and German. A move which did not go down well with France, symbolic of their loss of influence, who were opposed to Day due to her liberal economic reforms. Indeed, Day became very notable in the commission for her opposition to French state aid policies.

Concern has been expressed by Commissioners such as Günter Verheugen in regards to overlap of mandates and fractionalisation of the commission's Directorates-General, leading to "turf-wars" and a lack of co-ordination. A great deal of the commission's effort is expended in this in-fighting and weaker Commissioners, such as Verheugen, have not been able to gain sufficient control over their department.

== Politicisation ==
During Barroso's tenure, the commission has seen a general increase in the politicisation of its members. Although members are supposed to remain above national politics, members have been involved in national elections or backed national candidates. For example, Commissioner Michel participated in the 2007 Belgian elections while Commissioner Kroes backed Angela Merkel in the 2005 German elections and vice-president Wallström backed Ségolène Royal in the 2007 French elections.

Michel claimed that politicisation of this manner is part of reconnecting the Union with its citizens and Wallström defended it claiming that the EU has to get more political and controversial as being a vital role in communicating the commission. Wallström presented plans to give greater prominence to European political parties ahead of the 2009 elections and give the parties the ability to run with candidates for Commission President. There was speculation that under this scenario, if he gained backing, Barroso might run as the People's Party candidate in 2009.

== See also ==
- Institutions of the European Union
  - European Commission
  - List of presidents of EU institutions
- 2004 European Parliament election
  - 2007 European Parliament election
- History of the European Union
- Treaty establishing a Constitution for Europe
- Enlargement of the European Union
- Lisbon Strategy
- Climate Change
- Terrorism
- War on terrorism
- Iraq War
- Foreign relations of the European Union
- Doha Development Agenda
