= Vuokko Rehn =

Finnish politician

Vuokko Rehn (née Valjakka; 24 May 1938 — 13 September 2011) was a Finnish politician.

Rehn was active in the local politics of her home town, Mikkeli, serving on the city council and the municipal executive from to 1993 until 2010, including chairing the council from 2001 to 2004.

For the 1995-1999 term, Rehn served as a Member of the Parliament of Finland for the Mikkeli Province constituency (now part of Southeast Finland), representing the Centre Party.

Rehn was the only Centre Party MP who did not vote against Finland joining the European Monetary Union, returning instead an empty ballot; it is believed that this was a reason why she failed in her 1999 re-election bid. She is considered to have represented the liberal wing of her party.

Outside of politics, Rehn worked from 1960 to 1976 as a teacher of the English and Swedish languages. Afterwards, she ran the family's car parts business.

Vuokko Rehn's son is the economist and politician Olli Rehn.
