= European Commissioner for Enlargement =

Member of the EU Commission

- Flag of Europe

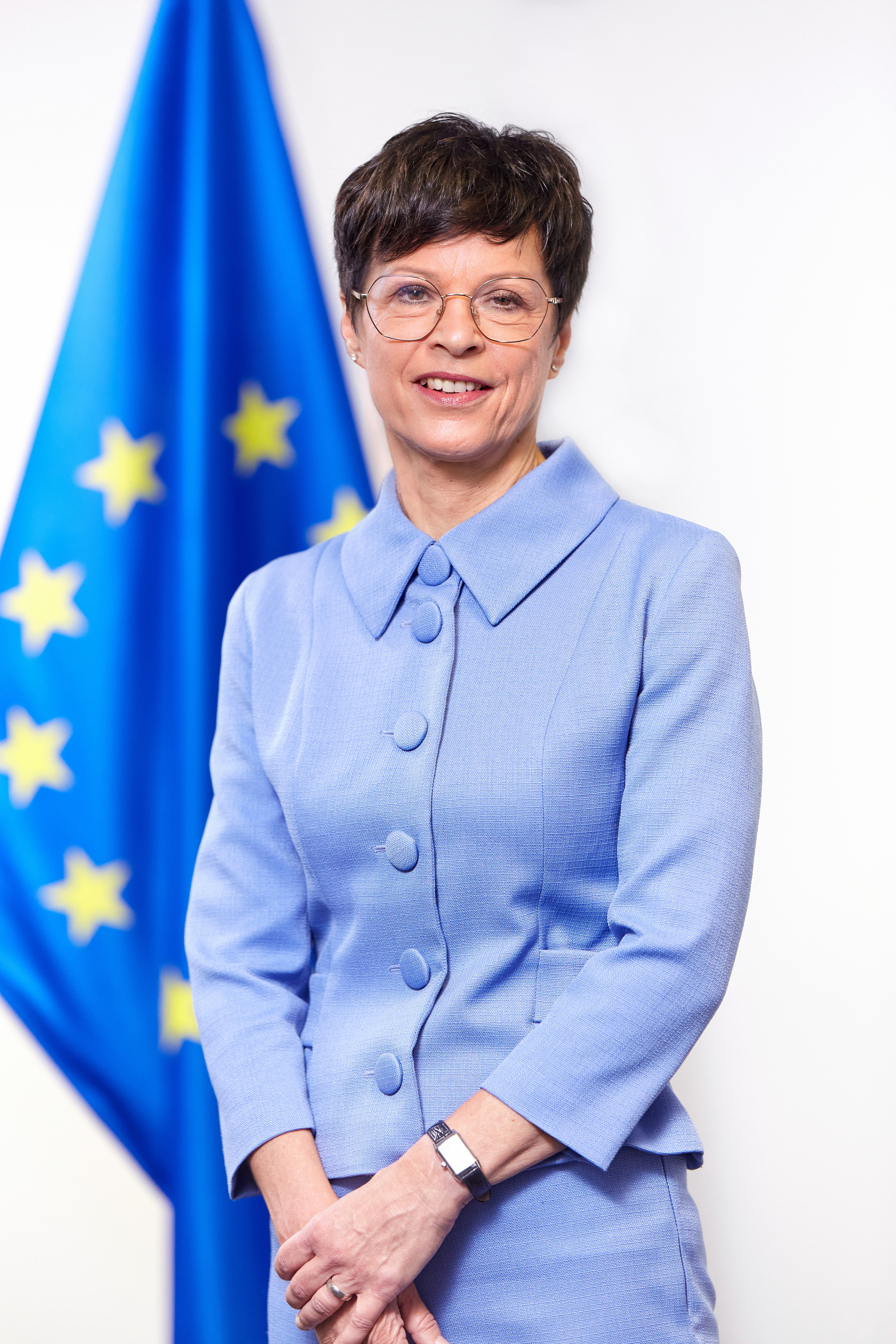
- Incumbent; Marta Kos since 1 December 2024
- European Commission
- Member of: European Commission
- Reports to: President of the European Commission
- Term length: 5 years
- Formation: 1999
- First holder: Günter Verheugen

The European Commissioner for Enlargement (Note: Previously European Commissioner for Enlargement and European Neighbourhood Policy, and European Commissioner for Neighbourhood and Enlargement) is a member of the European Commission responsible for overseeing the accession process of prospective new member states of the European Union (EU) and leading the Directorate-General for Enlargement and the Eastern Neighbourhood (DG ENEST).

As of 2025, there are nine official candidate countries for EU membership: Albania, Bosnia and Herzegovina, Georgia, Moldova, Montenegro, North Macedonia, Serbia, Turkey, and Ukraine. In addition, Kosovo is recognized as a potential candidate. Bosnia and Herzegovina was most recently granted candidate status in December 2022.

Since 2024, the Commissioner’s responsibilities have been limited strictly to enlargement policy and the Eastern Neighbourhood, following the creation of a separate Directorate-General for the Middle East, North Africa and the Gulf (DG MENA), led by the newly created Commissioner for the Mediterranean. Previously, the role also covered relations with the EU’s southern neighbourhood through the European Neighbourhood Policy.

The current Commissioner is Marta Kos, who has held the office in the von der Leyen II Commission since 1 December 2024.

== History ==
Günter Verheugen (1999–2004) was the first Commissioner to hold responsibility for Enlargement. His tenure oversaw the preparations for the historic 2004 enlargement, which brought ten new countries into the European Union: Cyprus, the Czech Republic, Estonia, Hungary, Latvia, Lithuania, Malta, Poland, Slovakia, and Slovenia.

Olli Rehn (2004–2010) succeeded Verheugen, and supervised the accession of Romania and Bulgaria in 2007, the granting of candidate status to Croatia (2004) and North Macedonia (2005), and the opening of accession talks with Montenegro following its independence in 2006. He was also active in negotiations related to Turkey’s candidacy and the status of Kosovo.

Štefan Füle (2010–2014) followed Rehn. Füle’s most notable achievement was overseeing the accession of Croatia in 2013, making it the EU’s 28th member state. His mandate also placed strong emphasis on the Eastern Partnership and the EU’s relations with countries on its eastern borders.

Johannes Hahn (2014–2019) took office as the enlargement agenda slowed. During his term, accession negotiations with the Western Balkans remained the central focus, while relations with Turkey became increasingly strained.

Olivér Várhelyi (2019–2024) served during a period when the enlargement process regained strategic importance, particularly in light of geopolitical tensions following Russia’s invasion of Ukraine in 2022. Under his tenure, Ukraine, Moldova, and Bosnia and Herzegovina were granted candidate status in 2022.

Marta Kos (2024–present) was appointed on 1 December 2024.

== List of Commissioners ==
No.	Portrait	Name	Term	Party		Commission	Member state
No.	Portrait	Name	Term	European	National	Commission	Member state
1		Günter Verheugen	1999–2004	PES	SPD	Prodi	Germany
* (Note: Served concurrently with Günter Verheugen in a transitional capacity following Slovenia’s accession to the EU.)		Janez Potočnik	2004	ALDE	LDS	Prodi	Slovenia
2		Olli Rehn	2004–2010	ALDE	C	Barroso I	Finland
3		Štefan Füle	2010–2014	PES	SOCDEM	Barroso II	Czech Republic
4		Johannes Hahn	2014–2019	EPP	ÖVP	Juncker	Austria
5		Olivér Várhelyi	2019–2024	Independent (Note: Associated with Fidesz)		Von der Leyen I	Hungary
6		Marta Kos	2024–present	Independent		Von der Leyen II	Slovenia

== See also ==
- Directorate-General for Neighbourhood and Enlargement Negotiations
- Enlargement of the European Union
- Foreign relations of the European Union
- European Union Association Agreement
- Deep and Comprehensive Free Trade Area
