= European Commissioner for Digital and Frontier Technologies =

Member of the EU Commission

- Flag of the EU

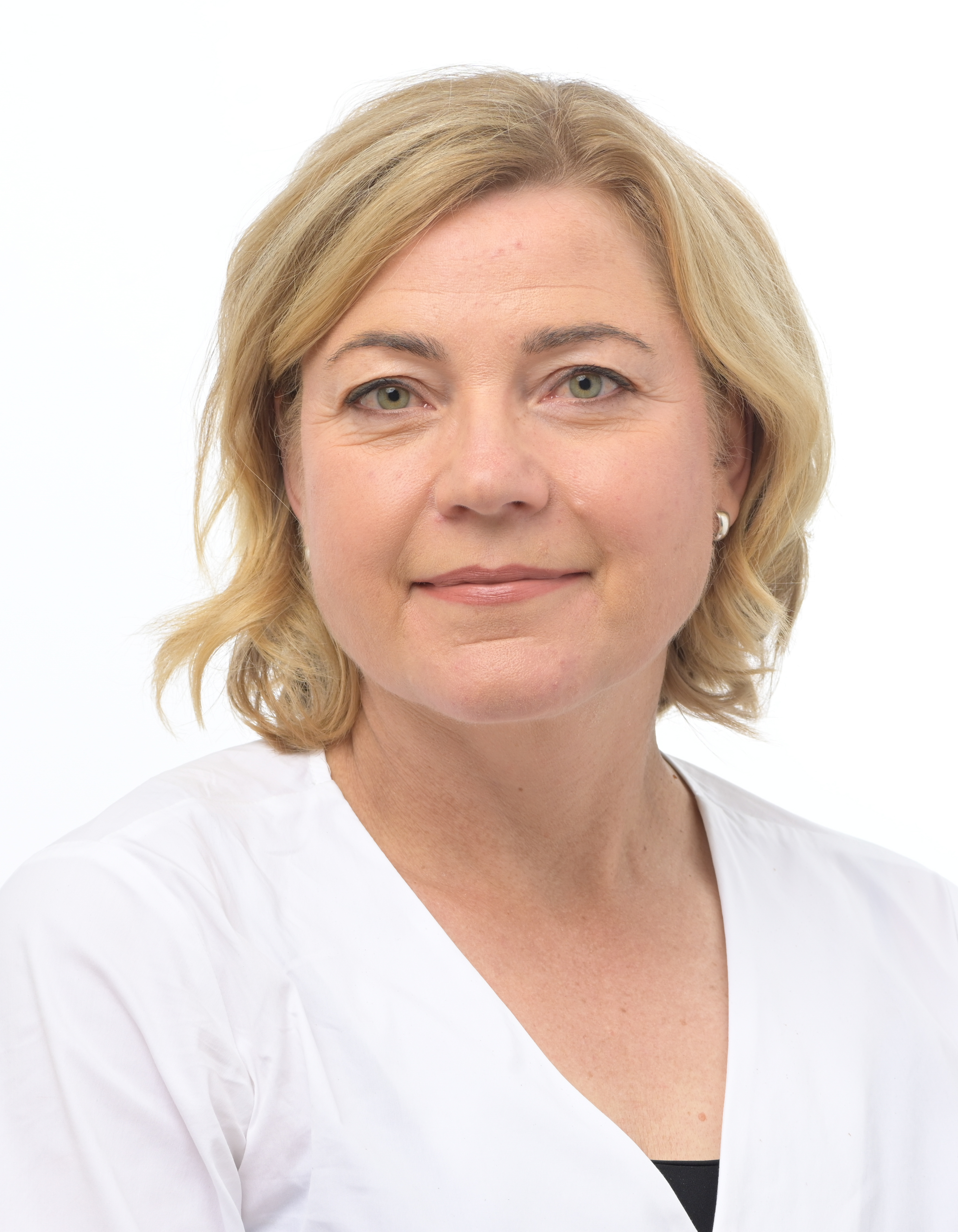
- Incumbent; Henna Virkkunen since 1 December 2024
- Member of: the European Commission
- Reports to: President of the European Commission
- Term length: 5 years
- Precursor: Commissioner for Digital Agenda
- Formation: 7 January 1985; 41 years ago
- First holder: Karl-Heinz Narjes

The European Commissioner for Digital and Frontier Technologies is a member of the European Commission responsible for media and information issues such as telecoms and IT. The current officeholder is Henna Virkkunen since December 2024.

The portfolio was previously Commissioner for Digital Economy and Society (previously for Digital Agenda). Mariya Gabriel served as Digital Economy and Society Commissioner from 2017 to 2019.

== Viviane Reding ==
Viviane Reding (2004–2010) found a relatively popular policy in seeking to lower roaming charges of mobile phones when travelling within the European Union, stating: "For years, mobile roaming charges have remained unjustifiably high. We are therefore tackling one of the last borders within Europe's internal market". Her legislation to cap roaming charges was approved by the Parliament in April 2007. Reding's successor Neelie Kroes greatly extended the range of the roaming regulation, to include data charges among others.

On 7 April 2006 the commission launched the new ".eu" TLD for websites for EU companies and citizens wishing to have a non-national European internet address. This has proved popular with 2.5M being registered by April 2007. It is now the seventh most popular TLD worldwide, and third in Europe (after .de and .uk)

Reding has also proposed that major European telecom companies be forced to separate their network and service operations to promote competition in the market. The companies, including France Telecom and Deutsche Telekom, would still own their networks but the separate management structure would be obliged to treat other operators on an equal basis in offering access to the network. This is opposed to separate ideas to force a full break-up of such companies.

== List of commissioners ==
In the previous Commission information society was linked with Enterprise (now linked with Industry).

#	Name	Country	Period	Commission
1	Karl-Heinz Narjes	West Germany	1985–1992	Delors Commission I & II
2	Antonio Ruberti	Italy	1992–1995	Delors Commission III
3	Martin Bangemann	Germany	1995–1999	Santer Commission
4	Erkki Liikanen	Finland	1999–2004	Prodi Commission
5	Ján Figeľ	Slovakia	2004	Prodi Commission
6	Viviane Reding	Luxembourg	2004–2010	Barroso Commission I
7	Neelie Kroes	Netherlands	2010–2014	Barroso Commission II
8	Günther Oettinger	Germany	2014–2016	Juncker Commission
9	Andrus Ansip	Estonia	2017	Juncker Commission
10	Mariya Gabriel	Bulgaria	2017–2019	Juncker Commission
11	Margrethe Vestager	Denmark	2019–2024	Von der Leyen Commission I
12	Henna Virkkunen	Finland	Incumbent	Von der Leyen Commission II

== See also ==
- .eu
- Directorate General for Communication Networks, Content and Technology
- Regulation on roaming charges in the European Union
