= Štefan Füle =

Czech diplomat (born 1962)

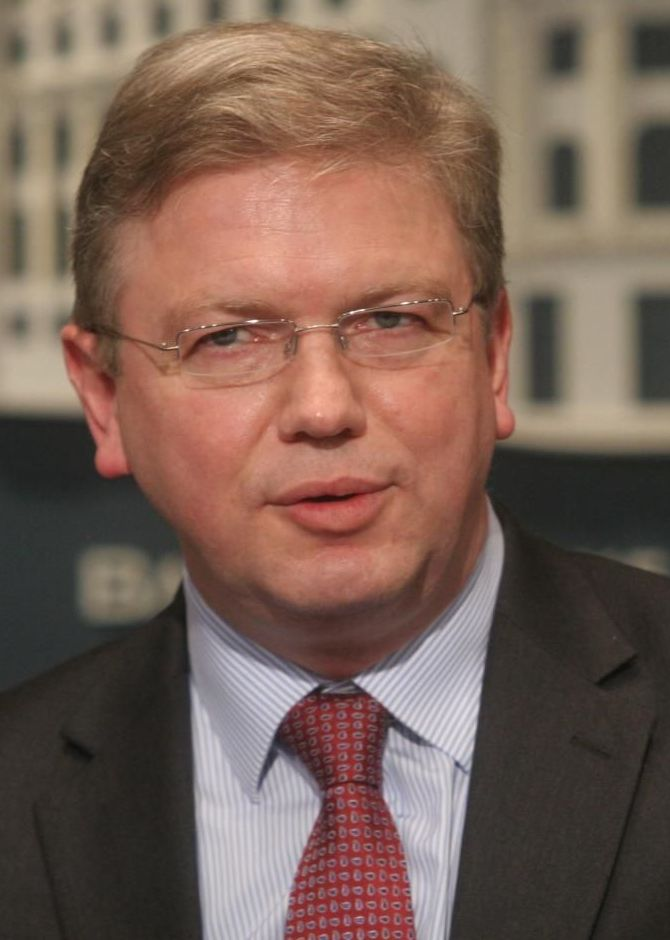
- Füle in 2013

European Commissioner for Enlargement and European Neighbourhood Policy
- In office 9 February 2010 – 1 November 2014
- President: José Manuel Barroso
- Preceded by: Olli Rehn (Enlargement); Benita Ferrero-Waldner (Trade and Neighbourhood Policy)
- Succeeded by: Johannes Hahn (European Neighbourhood Policy and Enlargement Negotiations)

Minister for European Affairs
- In office 8 May 2009 – 30 November 2009
- Prime Minister: Jan Fischer
- Preceded by: Alexandr Vondra
- Succeeded by: Juraj Chmiel

Personal details
- Born: 24 May 1962 (age 64) Sokolov, Czechoslovakia (now Czech Republic)
- Party: Communist Party of Czechoslovakia (1982–1989); Social Democratic Party (1989–present)
- Education: Charles University; Moscow State Institute of International Relations
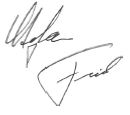
- Signature

Štefan Füle (born 24 May 1962) is a former Czech diplomat who served as the European Commissioner for Enlargement and European Neighbourhood Policy from February 2010 until October 2014.

== Early life and education ==
Füle was born on 24 May 1962 in Sokolov, then in Czechoslovakia. He studied at the Charles University in Prague (1980–1981, two semesters at the Faculty of Philosophy) and the Moscow State Institute of International Relations (1981–1986).

== Diplomatic career ==
He has held several positions within the Ministry of Foreign Affairs. Füle served as First Secretary of Permanent Mission of the Czech Republic (until 1993 Czechoslovakia) to the UN in New York City from 1990 to 1995. His next assignment was at the headquarters of the Ministry in Prague until 1998. Then he served as the Czech Ambassador to Lithuania (1998–2001), also being the NATO contact point there. In 2000, Füle accepted the position of the First Deputy Minister of Defense but later returned to diplomatic work. He had served as the nation's Ambassador to the United Kingdom (2003–2005) before being appointed as the Permanent Representative of his country to NATO (11 July 2005 – 7 May 2009).

== European Commissioner ==
Füle served as the Minister for European Affairs in the caretaker government of Jan Fischer in 2009, and served as the Commissioner for Enlargement and Neighbourhood Policy under the second Barroso Commission from February 2010 to October 2014.

=== Nomination ===
Fischer's government waited for political parties to agree on one candidate to become the next European Commissioner for the Czech Republic, but they were not able to agree on one name. Social Democrats nominated Vladimír Špidla and Civic Democrats endorsed Alexandr Vondra; Jan Švejnar and Pavel Svoboda were candidates of the minority Green Party and Christian Democrats, respectively. The Czech Republic was urged to announce a person's name by the President of the European Commission José Barroso. Prime Minister Jan Fischer was also offered the post but refused. There were rumors about Vladimír Dlouhý and Zdeněk Tůma being offered the post. Dlouhý was willing to accept the nomination and Tůma refused it. On 10 November 2009, the Cabinet made the decision of approving Füle's nomination.

=== Issues ===
Füle has argued that "enlargement is the most important transformation instrument the EU has" and attributes the "difficult reforms" that brought about Central and Southeastern Europe's political and economic transformations to the fact that they were "tak[ing[ place within the wider enlargement strategy".

He has been working hard to bring six of the EU's neighbors, Armenia, Azerbaijan, Belarus, Georgia, Moldova, and Ukraine, under its wing, but the anticipated summit in Vilnius, Lithuania in November 2013 only saw Georgia and Moldova initial association agreements, with Ukraine's last-minute cold feet a major disappointment.

On 18 July 2014, Füle was present to hear the Parliament of Georgia unanimously vote (123-0, 27 abstained) to ratify its association agreement. Before the vote, Prime Minister Irakli Gharibashvili told Füle his country had formulated a "Georgia 2020 social-democratic development strategy", aimed at easing European integration.

On Turkey's accession, Füle was, in 2013, optimistic in a long-term way: "Whenever I am asked if I could imagine Turkey in the EU, my answer is 'Yes, absolutely.' But it will be a different Turkey and it will be a different European Union".

In 2015, news media reported that Füle was included in a Russian blacklist of prominent people from the European Union who are not allowed to enter the country.

From the year 2016 Füle is a member of Prague Society for International Cooperation, a NGO whose main goals are networking and the development of a new generation of responsible, well-informed leaders and thinkers.

Political offices
Preceded by Alexandr Vondra	Minister for European Affairs; 2009	Succeeded by Juraj Chmiel
Preceded by Vladimír Špidla	Czech European Commissioner; 2010–2014	Succeeded by Věra Jourová
Preceded by Olli Rehn as European Commissioner for Enlargement	European Commissioner for Enlargement and European Neighbourhood Policy; 2010–2014	Succeeded by Johannes Hahn as European Commissioner for European Neighbourhood Policy and Enlargement Negotiations
Preceded by Benita Ferrero-Waldner as European Commissioner for Trade and European Neighbourhood Policy	European Commissioner for Enlargement and European Neighbourhood Policy; 2010–2014	Succeeded by Johannes Hahn as European Commissioner for European Neighbourhood Policy and Enlargement Negotiations
