= European Commissioner for Industry and Entrepreneurship =

- European Commission
- Style: Madame Commissioner
- Reports to: President of the European Commission
- Nominator: Member states in accordance with the President
- Appointer: The Parliament sworn in by the Council
- Term length: Five years
- Formation: 1999
- First holder: Erkki Liikanen
- Abolished: 2019
- Salary: €19,909 monthly
- Website: ec.europa.eu

The Commissioner for Industry and Entrepreneurship was a vice-president of the European Commission.

The post was enlarged from the Commissioner for Enterprise and Information Society portfolio in the Prodi Commission to include Industry.

== Verheugen (2004 to 2010) ==
At the start of the Barroso Commission Germany, backed by Britain and France suggested an economic "super-commissioner" to fight for competitiveness. Although rejected, this idea though has been taken on by Verheugen, as the Enterprise and Industry portfolio was enlarged and was made a Vice-President.

As Commissioner, he indicates his aim to increase the competitiveness of Europe, there is a separate Commissioner for Competition dealing with competition between companies within Europe. However, with the numerous economic portfolios, there is a degree of overlap which has been a matter of concern for him along with the purported difficulty of firing director-generals.

Verheugen also chairs the Competitiveness Council Commissioners Group and is the vice chair of the Group of Commissioners on the Lisbon Strategy. He is expected to be the European chair of the new Transatlantic Economic Council.

He has stated a desire to cut red tape, especially to make it more favourable to SMEs. He also highlights research and innovation as "twin keys to future competitiveness". He outlines his priorities as; better regulation, a modern industrial policy, SMEs and innovation. To promote competitiveness, he laid down three policies derived from the treaties; "Competitiveness and improvement of the business environment (Art. 157). Completing and managing the Internal Market for products (Art. 28 and 95) and Innovation and research framework programmes (Title XVIII)."

The commissioner was heavily involved in work on the REACH directive and ensuring its compatibility with the Lisbon Strategy. He sees a common patent in the Union implemented by 2012 which he sees as important as patent application for the 24 million SMEs in Europe are on average 11 times higher than in the United States.

Verheugen's head of cabinet is Petra Erler. His deputy head is Simon Mordue and his spokesperson is Ton van Lierop. There was a minor political row over Erler's appointment with allegations of her being appointed due to their friendship. These allegations were later aggravated over photos of them together on holiday holding hands, and then on a naturist beach together in Lithuania.

In response to the refusal of countries to sign the Kyoto Protocol, such as the United States and Australia, Verheugen asked President Barroso to look into whether the EU could implement taxes on products imported from those countries not taking low-carbon policies on board (Border Tax Adjustments).

== List of commissioners ==
#	Name	Country	Period	Commission
1	Erkki Liikanen	Finland	1999–2004	Prodi Commission
2	Ján Figeľ	Slovakia	2004	Prodi Commission
3	Günter Verheugen	Germany	2004–2010	Barroso Commission I
4	Antonio Tajani	Italy	2010–2014	Barroso Commission II
5	Ferdinando Nelli Feroci	Italy	2014	Barroso Commission II
6	Elżbieta Bieńkowska	Poland	2014–2019	Juncker Commission

== See also ==
- Directorate-General for Enterprise and Industry
- Lisbon Strategy
- European Commissioner for Economic and Financial Affairs
- European Commissioner for Competition
