= Hanseatic Parliament =

Voluntary association

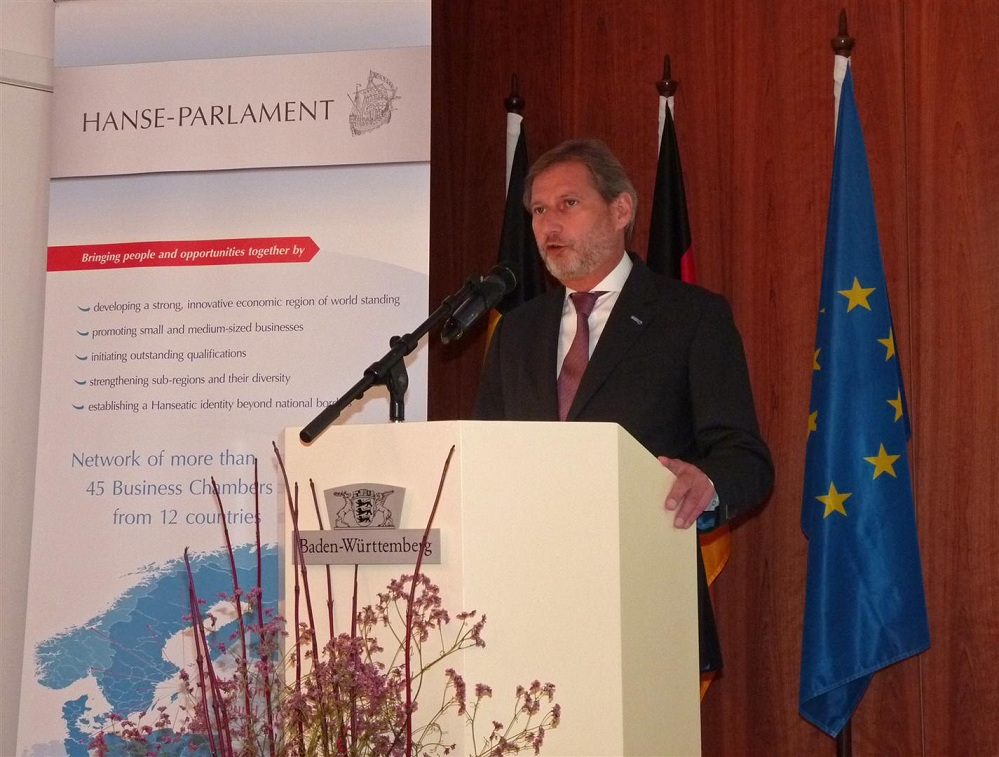
EU Commissioner Johannes Hahn at the General Assembly of the Hanse Parlament 2012

The Hanseatic Parliament (Hanse Parlament) is an association of more than 50 business chambers (chambers of crafts, chambers of commerce and other similar bodies) around the Baltic Sea region with the common goal of promoting the small and medium-sized companies (SMEs), in particular in the fields of qualification, research and innovation. There is strong cooperation with the public sectors in the countries involved, but the Parliament is a non-governmental and non-profit organization.

The Hanseatic Parliament was established in 2004. Originally its headquarters was located in Copenhagen, but moved to Hamburg. Its role model is the Hanseatic League of the late Middle Ages, but its focus is on the Baltic Sea region, whereas the original League had a much larger field of operations. The Parliament seeks to foster a common identity in the Baltic Sea region, for example through the annual Hanseatic Conference, at which it academics, politicians and businesspeople discuss culturally related topics.

The organisation is implementing several EU-funded projects, also flagship projects within the EU Strategy for the Baltic Sea Region, that was initiated in 2009. In 2010 the Hanseatic Parliament established the Baltic Sea Academy, a non-profit network of 15 academic institutions with the common goal to bridge the gap between R&D institutions and SMEs.

== Hanseatic Conferences ==
On an annual basis the Hanseatic Parliament is hosting the "Hanseatic Conference", a two-day conference limited to 120 participants from businesses, politics and the academic sector to discuss on topic in relation to the medium-sized economy. The conference is coined by the very vivid participation of the participants. After two to three presentations, the participants discuss on round tables and develop scenarios and visions for the future. The meetings attract reputable speakers, i.e. in 2011 EU Commissioner Günther Oettinger or in 2012 EU Commissioner Johannes Hahn, EU Commissioner Algirdas Šemeta, in 2013 Minister of Defence of Latvia Artis Pabriks. Following the conferences, presentations, academic papers and discussions are published in a book by the Baltic Sea Academy.

== See also ==
- Hanseatic League
- Small and medium enterprise
