= Piotr Serafin =

Polish official

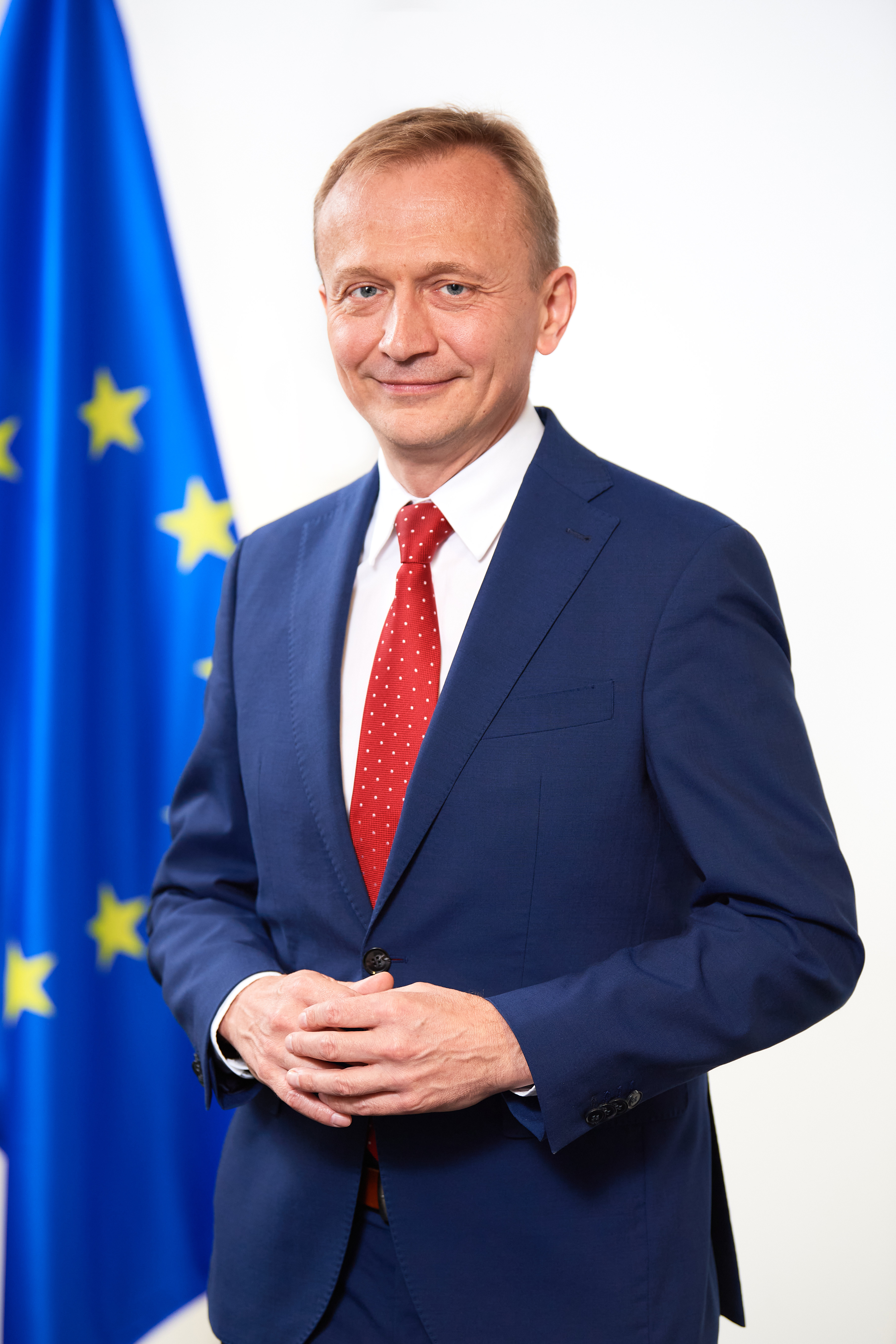
- Official portrait, 2024

European Commissioner for Budget and Administration
- Incumbent
- Assumed office 1 December 2024
- Commission: Von der Leyen II
- Preceded by: Johannes Hahn

Permanent Representative of Poland to the European Union
- In office 13 December 2023 – 14 October 2024
- Preceded by: Andrzej Sadoś
- Succeeded by: Agnieszka Bartol

Secretary of State of Foreign Affairs
- In office 22 May 2012 – 22 September 2014
- Prime Minister: Donald Tusk
- Minister: Radosław Sikorski

Undersecretary of State of Foreign Affairs
- In office 1 January 2010 – 18 February 2010
- Prime Minister: Donald Tusk
- Minister: Radosław Sikorski

Undersecretary of State for European Integration
- In office 16 January 2008 – 1 January 2010
- Prime Minister: Donald Tusk
- Minister: Radosław Sikorski

Personal details
- Born: Piotr Arkadiusz Serafin; 12 January 1974 (age 52) Sulęcin, Poland
- Party: Civic Coalition
- Children: 2
- Education: SGH Warsaw School of Economics; University of Warsaw
- Occupation: Lawyer; Diplomat; Civil servant; Politician
- Awards: Cross of Merit (2005); Order of Polonia Restituta (2014); National Order of Merit (Romania) (2020)

Piotr Arkadiusz Serafin (Polish pronunciation: [ˈpjɔtr arˈkadjuʂ sɛˈrafin]; born 12 January 1974) is a Polish politician and lawyer who has served as European Commissioner for Budget, Anti-Fraud and Public Administration since December 2024. Between 2007–2008, he served as Undersecretary of State for European Integration and between 2012–2014 as Secretary of State of Foreign Affairs.

== Early life and education ==
Serafin graduated in economics at the SGH Warsaw School of Economics, and in law at the University of Warsaw. He was a postgraduate student of European integration at the University of Sussex.

== Career ==
Serafin began his professional career at the Office of the Committee for European Integration (UKIE) in 1998. In 2004 he became director of the Analysis and Strategy Department. Between 16 January 2008 and 31 December 2009, he was Undersecretary of State at UKIE and National Aid Coordinator for the Phare and Transition Facility programmes. Following the merging of UKIE and the Ministry of Foreign Affairs in 2010, he was appointed Undersecretary of State at MFA.

In February 2010, Serafin was appointed the deputy head of Cabinet of the EU Commissioner for Financial Programming and Budget Janusz Lewandowski. He served as the Secretary of State at MFA from 22 May 2012 until 24 September 2014. On 1 December 2014, Serafin took the position of the Head of the Cabinet of the President of the European Council, Donald Tusk.

From 13 December 2023 to October 2024, Serafin served as the acting Permanent Representative of Poland to the European Union. In August 2024, he was nominated by the Polish Government to be Poland's next European Commissioner.

== Personal life ==
Serafin is married and has two daughters.

== Honours ==
- 2005 – Silver Cross of Merit, Poland
- 2014 – Officer's Cross of the Order of Polonia Restituta, Poland
- 2020 – Commander's Cross of the National Order of Merit, Romania
