= Baltic Sea Academy =

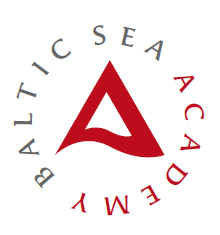
Logo of the Baltic Sea Academy

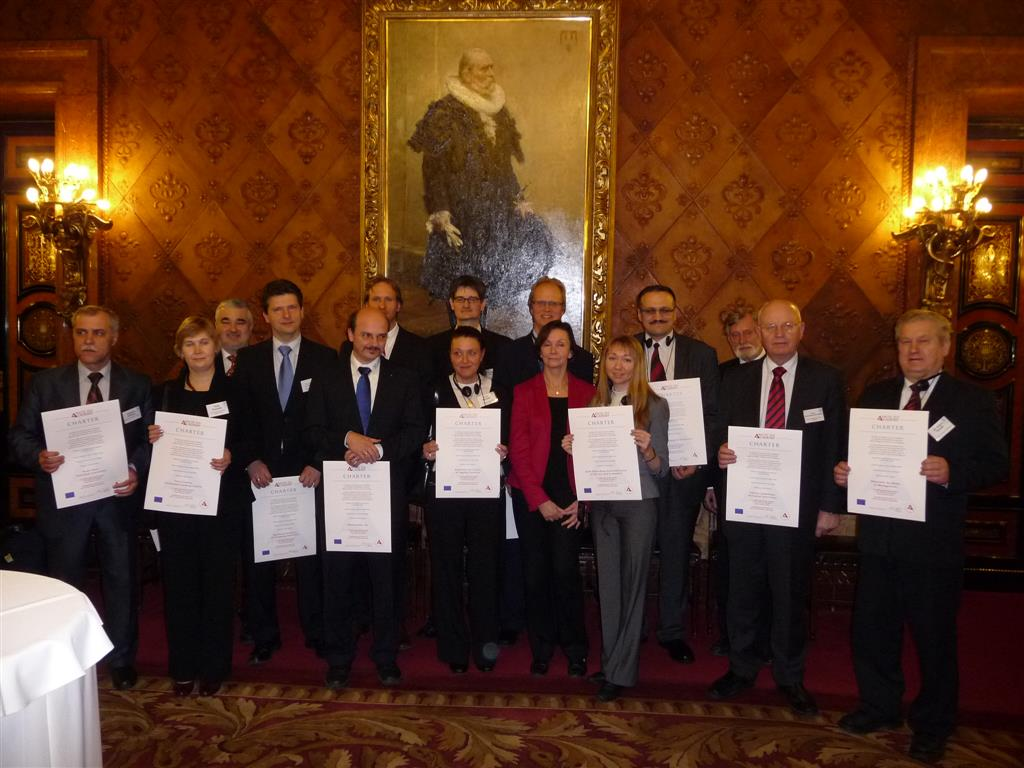
Picture of the founding meeting, February 2010

The Baltic Sea Academy is a network of 15 universities from 9 countries bordering the Baltic Sea region. It was initiated by the Hanseatic Parliament and established as a nonprofit organization association in February 2010 . The common objective is to bridge the gap between the small and medium-sized companies (SMEs) and the academic world. The Baltic Sea Academy is actively supporting companies with concrete R&D solutions, but is also creating and implementing tailor made curricula for SMEs. The promotion of innovative solutions for SMEs is a priority for the realised R&D tasks, with regards to the created study courses the focus is on the Dual education system, allowing a combination of practical skills and academic knowledge.

== Hanseatic Conferences ==
On an annual basis the Baltic Sea Academy and the Hanse Parliament are hosting the "Hanseatic Conference", a two-day conference limited to 120 participants from businesses, politics and the academic sector to discuss one topic in relation to the medium-sized economy. The conference is coined by the very vivid participation of the participants. After two to three presentations, the participants discuss on round tables and develop scenarios and visions for the future. The meetings attract reputable speakers, i.e. in 2011 EU Commissioner Günther Oettinger or in 2012 EU Commissioner Algirdas Šemeta. Following the conferences, presentations, academic papers and discussions are published in a book by the Baltic Sea Academy.

== Publications ==
The Baltic Sea Academy publishes peer-reviewed papers from conferences and strategic programs on an irregular basis. So far the following publications have been printed:

- Strategies for the Development of Crafts and SMEs in the Baltic Sea Region, 180 pages (German, Polish, English, Russian) 2011
- Education Policy Strategies today and tomorrow around the "Mare Balticum", 432 pages (German, English), 2011
- Energy Efficiency and Climate Protection around the Mare Balticum, 264 pages (German, English), 2011
- Strategy Programme for education policies in the Baltic Sea Region, 172 pages (German, Polish, English), 2012
- SME relevant sectors in the BSR: Personnel organisation, Energy and Construction, 188 pages (English), 2012
- Strategies and Promotion of Innovation in Regional Policies around the Mare Balticum, 432 pages, (German, English), 2012
- Strategy Programme for innovation in regional policies in the Baltic Sea Region, 240 pages (German, Polish, English) 2012
- Humanivity - Innovative economic development through human growth, 248 pages (English), 2012
