= Johannes Hahn =

Austrian politician (born 1957)

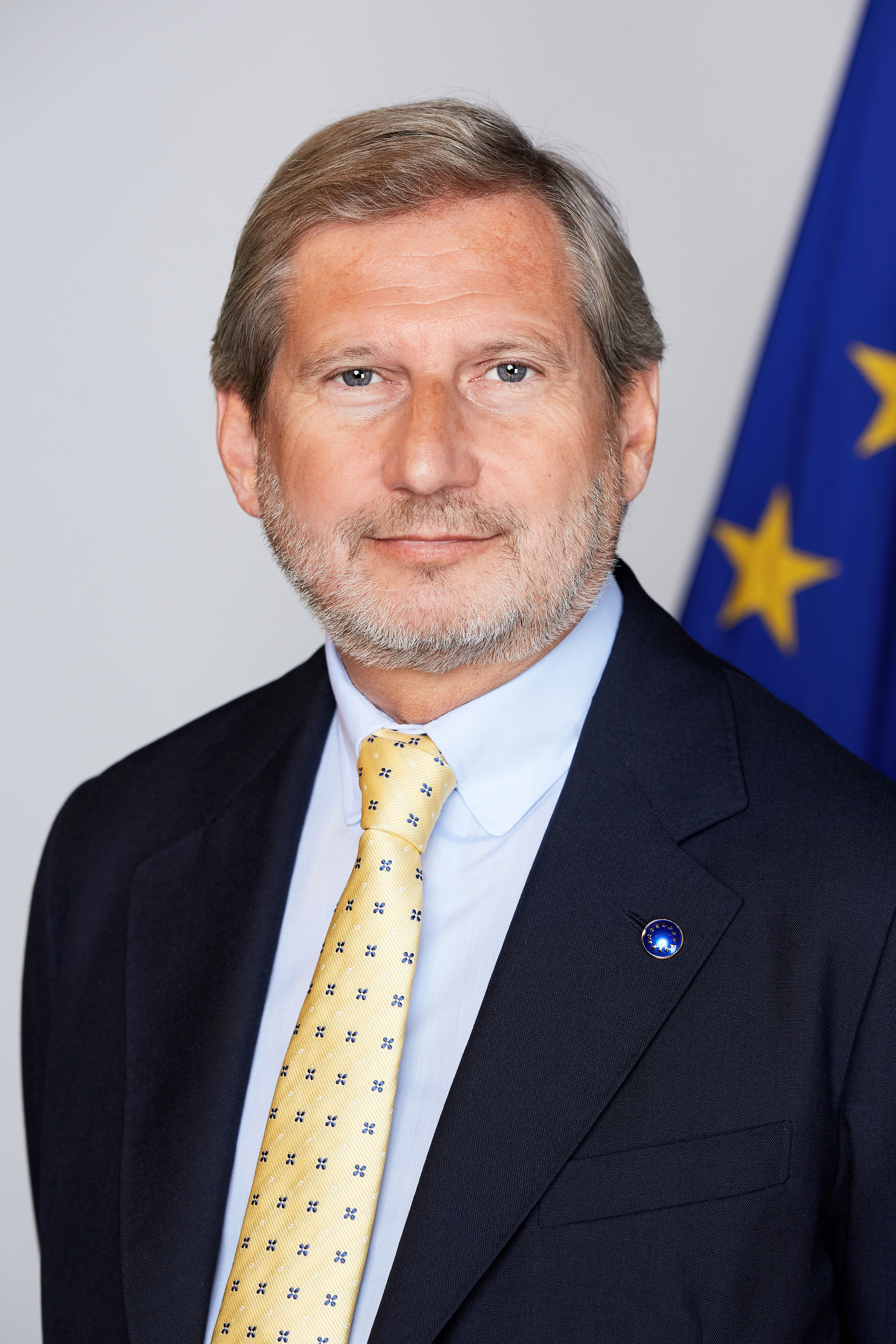
- Official portrait, 2020

European Commissioner for Budget and Administration
- In office 1 December 2019 – 30 November 2024
- Commission: Von der Leyen I
- Preceded by: Günther Oettinger
- Succeeded by: Piotr Serafin

European Commissioner for European Neighbourhood Policy and Enlargement Negotiations
- In office 1 November 2014 – 30 November 2019
- Commission: Juncker
- Preceded by: Štefan Füle (Enlargement and European Neighbourhood Policy)
- Succeeded by: Olivér Várhelyi

European Commissioner for Regional Policy
- In office Acting: 3 July 2019 – 30 November 2019
- Commission: Juncker
- Preceded by: Corina Crețu
- Succeeded by: Elisa Ferreira (Cohesion and Reform)
- In office 9 February 2010 – 1 November 2014
- Commission: Barroso II
- Preceded by: Paweł Samecki
- Succeeded by: Corina Crețu

Minister of Science and Research
- In office 11 January 2007 – 26 January 2010
- Chancellor: Alfred Gusenbauer; Werner Faymann
- Preceded by: Elisabeth Gehrer
- Succeeded by: Beatrix Karl

Personal details
- Born: 2 December 1957 (age 68) Vienna, Austria
- Party: People's Party
- Other party: European People's Party
- Spouse(s): Marina Bleibtreu (divorced) Susanne Riess (m. 2022)
- Children: 1
- Education: University of Vienna
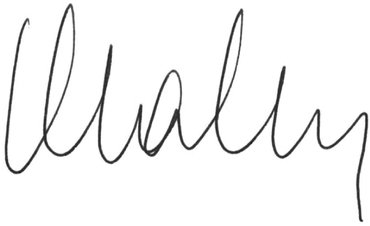
- Signature

Johannes Hahn (born 2 December 1957) is an Austrian politician who served as European Commissioner for Budget and Administration under Ursula von der Leyen from 2019 to 2024.

He previously served as European Commissioner for European Neighbourhood Policy and Enlargement Negotiations from November 2014 to November 2019 and before that as European Commissioner for Regional Policy from 2010 to 2014. Before entering the European Commission, Hahn served as the Austrian Minister for Science and Research from 2007 to 2010. He is a member of the Austrian People's Party (ÖVP), part of the European People's Party (EPP).

== Early life ==
Hahn studied at the University of Vienna and began his political career in the youth organisation of the Austrian People's Party (JVP), where he was chairman of the Vienna group from 1980 to 1985. In the 1980s, Hahn drafted the first European manifesto of the ÖVP's youth wing, where he was deputy leader. He adopted a decidedly pro-European position at a time when many within the party had doubts about Austria's accession to the EU.

== Doctoral thesis ==
Hahn graduated with a doctorate in philosophy from the University of Vienna in 1987. In May 2007, media scholar Stefan Weber accused Hahn of copying numerous pages of his PhD thesis from other books without citing them correctly. The suspected plagiarism was not confirmed by an expert committee from the University of Zurich that looked into the matter. Other academics contested this evaluation. The University of Vienna looked into the matter but decided not to start an examination procedure, saying that Hahn never presented "other people's intellectual property" as his own. Renewed allegation of plagiarism emerged in February 2011, when Austrian Green MP Peter Pilz commissioned Stefan Weber to re-assess Hahn's PhD thesis. End of May 2011, the expert group published its findings, listing 76 cases of plagiarism, which together account for at least 17.2% of Hahn's 254-page doctoral thesis. Hahn denied the charges and claimed they were "politically motivated, hardly surprising and not relevant." In April 2011, the University of Vienna asked the Austrian Agency for Research Integrity to examine Hahn's doctoral thesis. In November 2011, the university released a statement saying that in the university's opinion, Hahn's doctoral thesis wasn't plagiarism. The university's vice-chancellor added that "today, such a dissertation would not be accepted". The agency based its verdict on reports by three external experts. Neither the Agency for Research Integrity nor the University of Vienna would reveal the identities of the external experts.

== Years from 1987 to 2007 ==
From 1987 to 1989 Hahn worked as Secretary General of the Austrian Managers Association, and was active in the Austrian Federal Youth Council (ÖBJR) and the General Secretariat of the Austrian People's Party (ÖVP). In 1992 Hahn became Secretary of the Austrian People's Party in Vienna and, in 1996, he became a member of the Vienna regional council, where he seated until 2003. In the same years (1997–2003) he served as a member of the supervisory board at Novomatic, an online gaming and casino management system firm, of which he was appointed CEO in 2003.

From 2003 to 2007 Hahn was a member of the Vienna regional government (without portfolio). Since 2004 Hahn has been Chairman of the Austrian People's Party in Vienna and, as such, was the party frontrunner in the October 2005 regional elections in which an increase in votes for the ÖVP (and a slight loss in votes for the FPÖ) made the ÖVP the second strongest party in the regional parliament, with 18 seats.

== Activities for Novomatic ==
From 1997 onwards, Hahn was member of the executive board of Novomatic. In 2003, he became the CEO. Novomatic is an international gambling company, founded by the billionaire Johann Graf in 1980. There are several controversies about the company (Novomatic subsidiary G. Matica in Italy; gambling in Poland investigations by the Romanian National Anticorruption Directorate)

== Minister of Science and Research ==
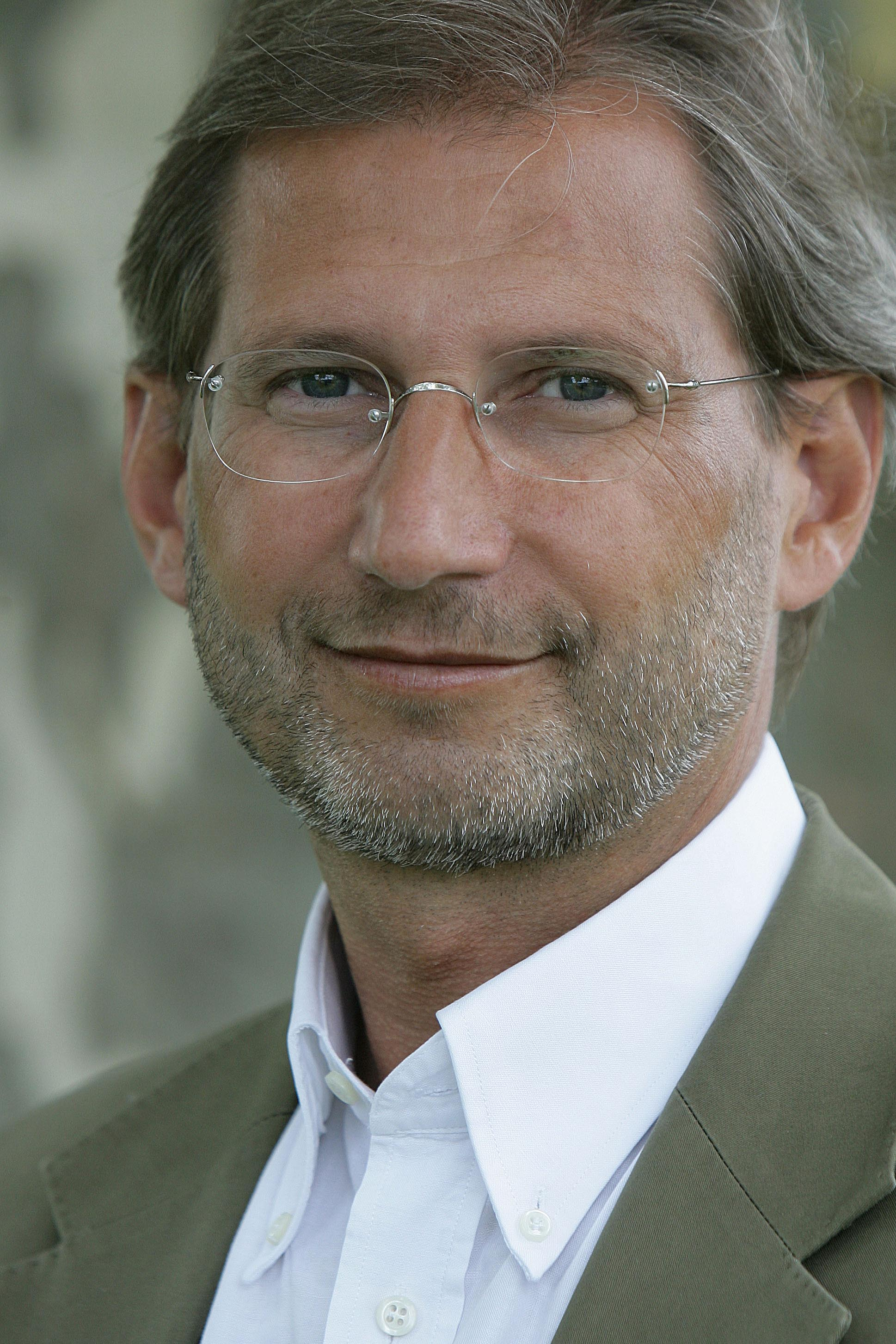
Hahn in 2007

Johannes Hahn was sworn in as Minister of Science and Research on 11 January 2007, as part of the Austrian Federal Government under Alfred Gusenbauer, then from 2 December 2008 as part of the First Faymann government.

Amongst other things, in his work Hahn has placed a particular focus on improving public relations for people and institutions working in and around the fields of science and research. Numerous campaigns, events and projects have promoted "Children's University" projects, the "Sparkling Science" programme, the "Visibility Measures" to raise public awareness of the work done by women scientists, the Forte Coaching Programme, the "Long Night of Research", as well as various awards, such as the Wittgenstein Prize. Hahn's aim has been to bring more researchers into the public eye as, for example, he publicly called upon the Austrian Academy of Sciences to "come out of their ivory tower".

During Hahn's term of office, all graduates of degree programmes at Fachhochschulen were given equal status to their university graduate counterparts in the civil service and all students enrolled in Fachhochschule study programmes have been recognised as full members of the Austrian Students' Association (ÖH) since December 2007. In April 2008, Hahn announced the first ever budget increase (average of 13.7 per cent more per university place) in the history of Austrian Fachhochschulen.

One of Hahn's aims has been to raise public awareness of the great number of successful women in science and research in Austria by means of the so-called "Visibility Measures" which were launched in 2008. This included media training, a film script competition on the topic of women scientists, the fForte Coaching Programme as well as the appointment of women scientists to management positions

In co-operation with Austrian booksellers, Hahn launched an initiative in autumn 2007 to select the best scientific book of the year. In 2008 Hahn created the "Award of Excellence" for the best doctoral theses in Austria, as a way of recognising the work of young scientists and making the public more aware of their activities. Each of them received 2,500 euro in prize money. Nominations for these awards were made by the vice-chancellors of Austrian universities. Hahn has also continued the tradition of awarding the Wittgenstein Prize, a science prize with the highest money value in Austria (1.5 million euro), which attracts a great deal of media attention and is tied to research activities in the following six years. The Long Night of Research was re-introduced under Minister Hahn after an interval of several years as an important way to communicate enthusiasm for and information about research and to provide a platform on which researchers can show to the wider public their work and their commitment.

With Hahn as Minister of Science Austria finally become, on 1 July 2008, the 14th member of the European Southern Observatory (ESO), which astronomers had been calling for Austria to join for over thirty years. Hahn himself stated that joining ESO had been one of the most significant political decisions in the field of research for 20 years, from which not only astronomers but also physicists, mathematicians, software specialists and high-tech companies would benefit. At the beginning of 2009, contracts had been formulated that will benefit Austrian scientists to the total amount of 5 million euro, leading to a boom in the field of Austrian astronomy.

Hahn also announced in May 2009, during a parliamentary sub-committee debate on the Austrian science and research budget for 2009 and 2010, that he wanted to end Austria's 50-year membership of CERN as of 2010 because the costs were too high (up to 70 per cent of the total Austrian resources available for membership of research associations go for the 16 million euro annual CERN membership fee). Austrian Chancellor Werner Faymann publicly spoke out against a withdrawal from CERN. An actual withdrawal would have also required a decision of the National Council.

In addition to support for applied and economically oriented research in the field of climate research, Hahn has called for more resources for basic and adaptation research in Austria, which should be independent of financial interests and thus be sustainable.

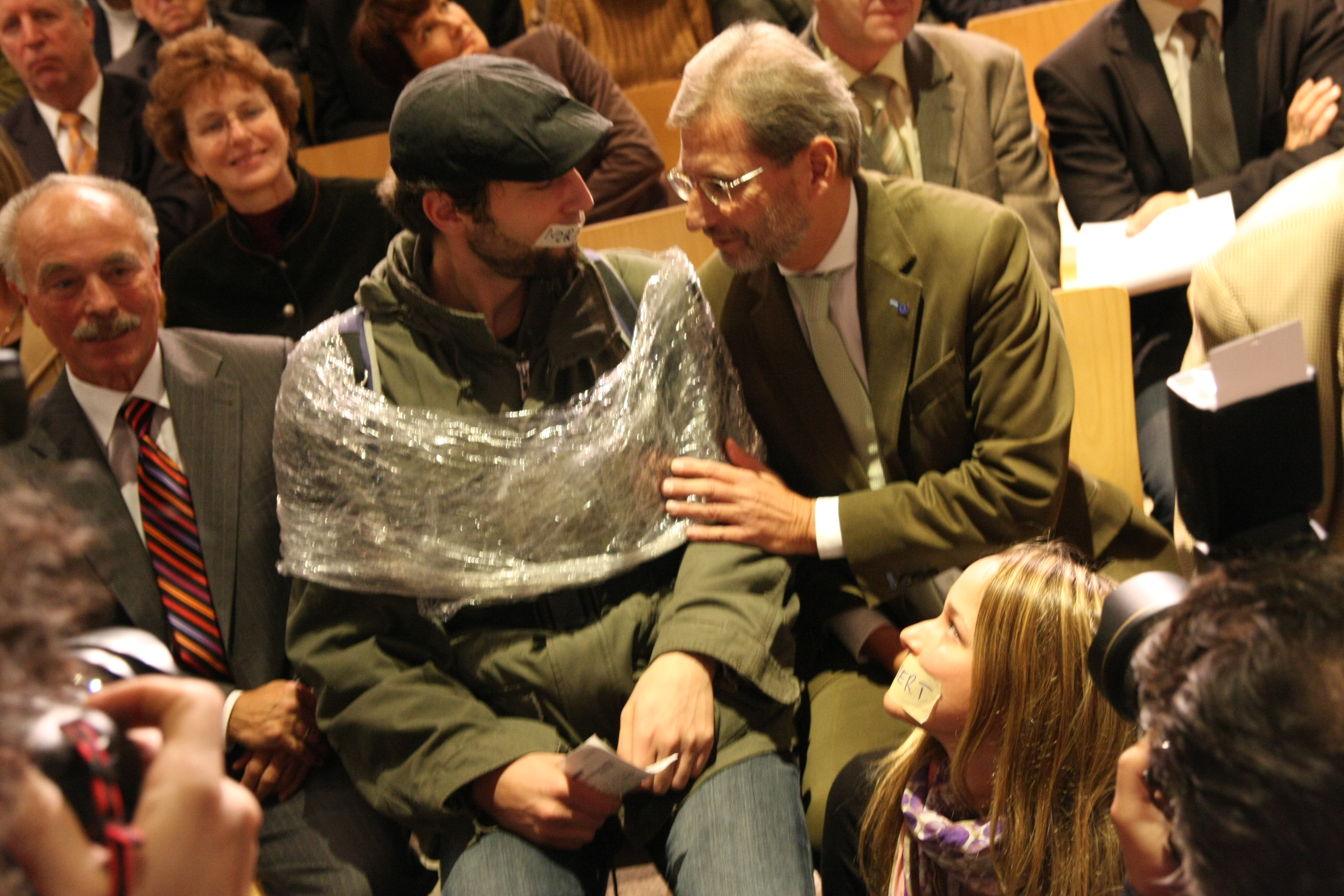
Hahn with some students protesting, 2009

During Hahn's term of office, student grants were increased in 2007 by 12 per cent (maximum monthly grant 679 euro). In 2008 the limit on the amount that anyone receiving a student grant could earn in addition to their grant was raised to 8000 euro; the parental income level was raised by 20 per cent; study grants for students with children were increased (i.e. by raising age limits and a supplementary payment of 720 euro for each child); there were improvements for disabled students, as well as mobility grants – a complete course of study abroad was financed for the first time. In 2009 there was an increase of 33 per cent in performance-related grants (i.e. a further 2 million euro, or 2,800 more grants).

Following uncertainty regarding the Austrian Science Fund (FWF) budget in spring 2009, in autumn of the same year Hahn proposed introducing legislation on research financing that would regulate by law the budget for state expenditure on research until 2020. Public expenditure on research and development would increase by 2.5 million to 5 million per year by 2020, thus building confidence and developing and consolidating Austria as a research location. Hahn particularly emphasised the importance of making a combined effort on all fronts, including the integration of educational policy, since education and training constitute the main pre-requisites of a competitive research location.

== European Commissioner for Regional Policy ==
In November 2009 Hahn was nominated by the Austrian Federal Government to succeed Benita Ferrero-Waldner as member of the European Commission from Austria. Reportedly, while the ÖVP's first choice for Commissioner would have been Wilhelm Molterer, this was vetoed by chancellor Werner Faymann, opening the road for Hahn. Faymann later confirmed him in 2014

President Barroso appointed Hahn as European Commissioner for Regional Policy. Hahn's appointment to the European Commission meant that he had to resign his position as chairman of the Austrian People's Party in Vienna, as commissioners of Barroso Commission II are not allowed to hold political office nationally, although party membership is permitted.

He was twice appointed Acting Commissioner for Justice, Fundamental Rights and Citizenship in Viviane Reding's stead, from 19 April 2014 – 25 May 2014 while she was on electoral campaign leave for the 2014 elections to the European Parliament and from 1 July 2014 – 16 July 2014 after she took up her seat.

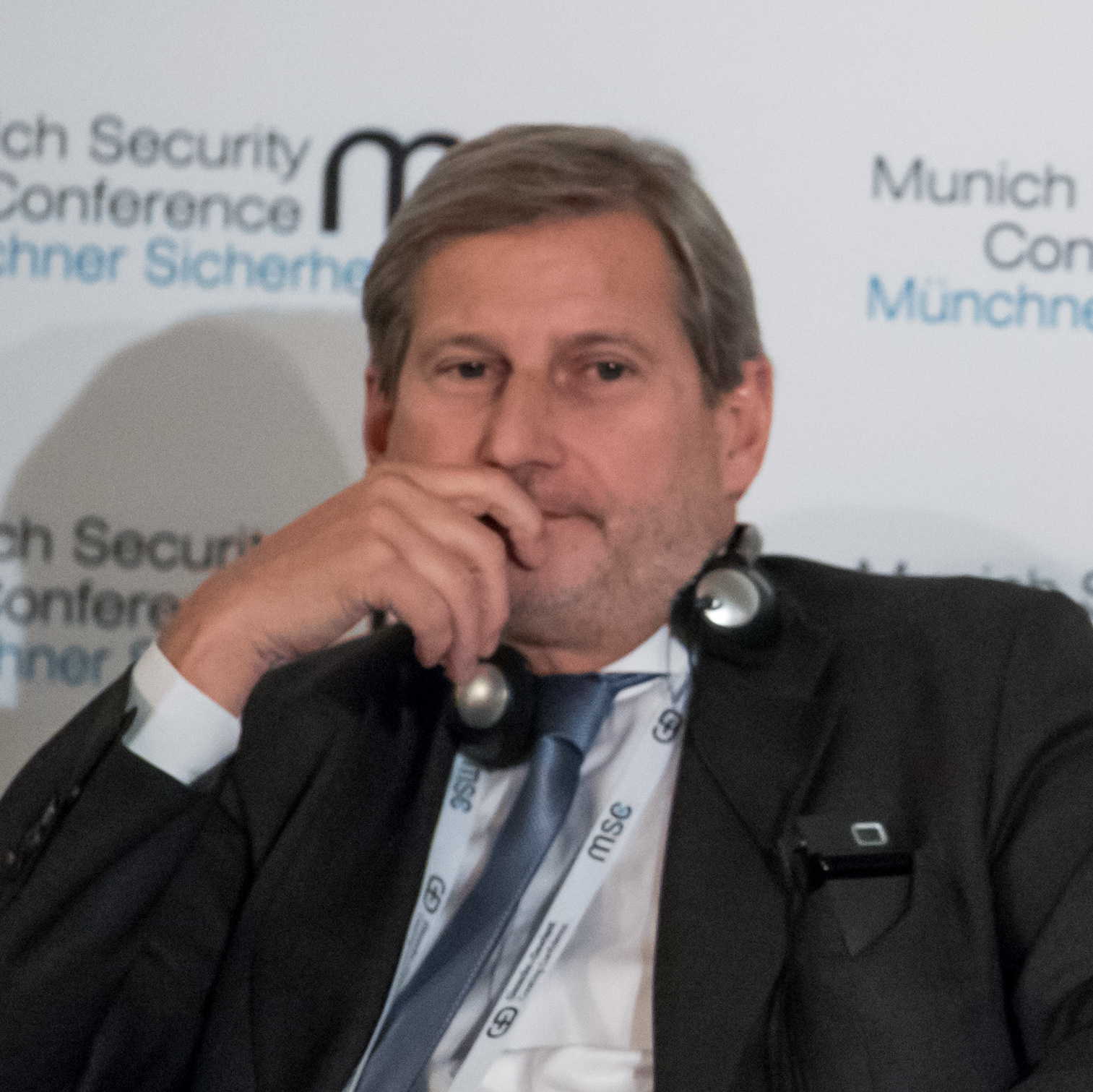
Hahn during the Munich Security Conference 2018

During his term as European Commissioner for Regional Policy (February 2010 – November 2014) Hahn implemented an ambitious and comprehensive reform of EU Regional Policy, linking it closer with EU economic governance and macro-economic conditions; introducing clearly defined conditions; and establishing a better evaluation system. Based on the new regulation, European regions have developed so called smart specialisation strategies to identify their particular strengths and potentials as the basis for investments. The adoption of smart specialisation strategy was an ex-ante conditionality for the approval of regional programs for the period 2014–2020. Despite cuts in the overall EU budget, Hahn succeeded to keep the high level of financial support for strategic investments in the new period (2014–2020): Funding for regional and cohesion policy in 2014–2020 amounts to 351,8 billion Euro. Taking into account the national contribution of member states, and the leverage effect of financial instruments, the overall impact of investments is likely to be about 600 billion Euro. Parts of the reform were already implemented in the last year of the Barroso term. Thanks to increased flexibility, allowing reprogramming of structural funds, the reformed Cohesion Policy paid also an important role in overcoming coping with the economic crisis. Measures in this context were e.g. reallocation of unused funds for education, training and employment as well as for providing urgently needed liquidity for enterprises . The reform, endorsed by the Council and European Parliament with overwhelming majority and strongly supported also by stakeholders and the Committee of the Regions, established Hahn's reputation as a "forward looking, bold reformer".

Despite cuts in the overall EU budget, Hahn succeeded to keep the high level of financial support for strategic investments in the new period (2014–2020): Funding for regional and cohesion policy in 2014–2020 amounts to 351,8 bn EUR. The reform, endorsed by the Council of the European Union and the European Parliament with overwhelming majority and strongly supported also by stakeholders and the Committee of the Regions, established Hahn's reputation as a "forward looking, bold reformer". More detailed information on the fundamental reform of Regional Policy can be found here: Cohesion Policy Reform in 10 points The Reform of Cohesion Policy

== European Commissioner for Neighbourhood and Enlargement Negotiations ==
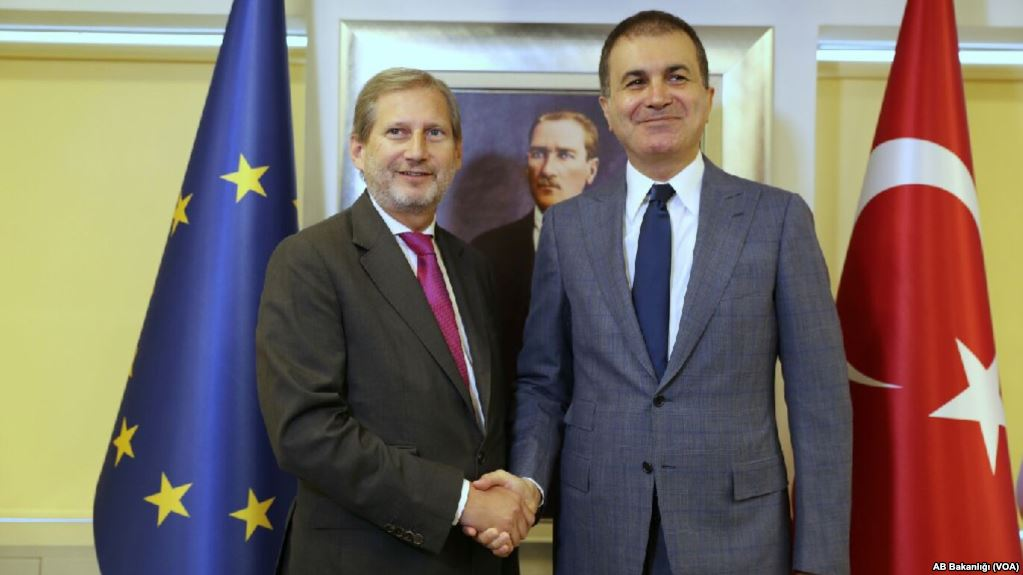
With Turkey's EU Minister Ömer Çelik, July 2017

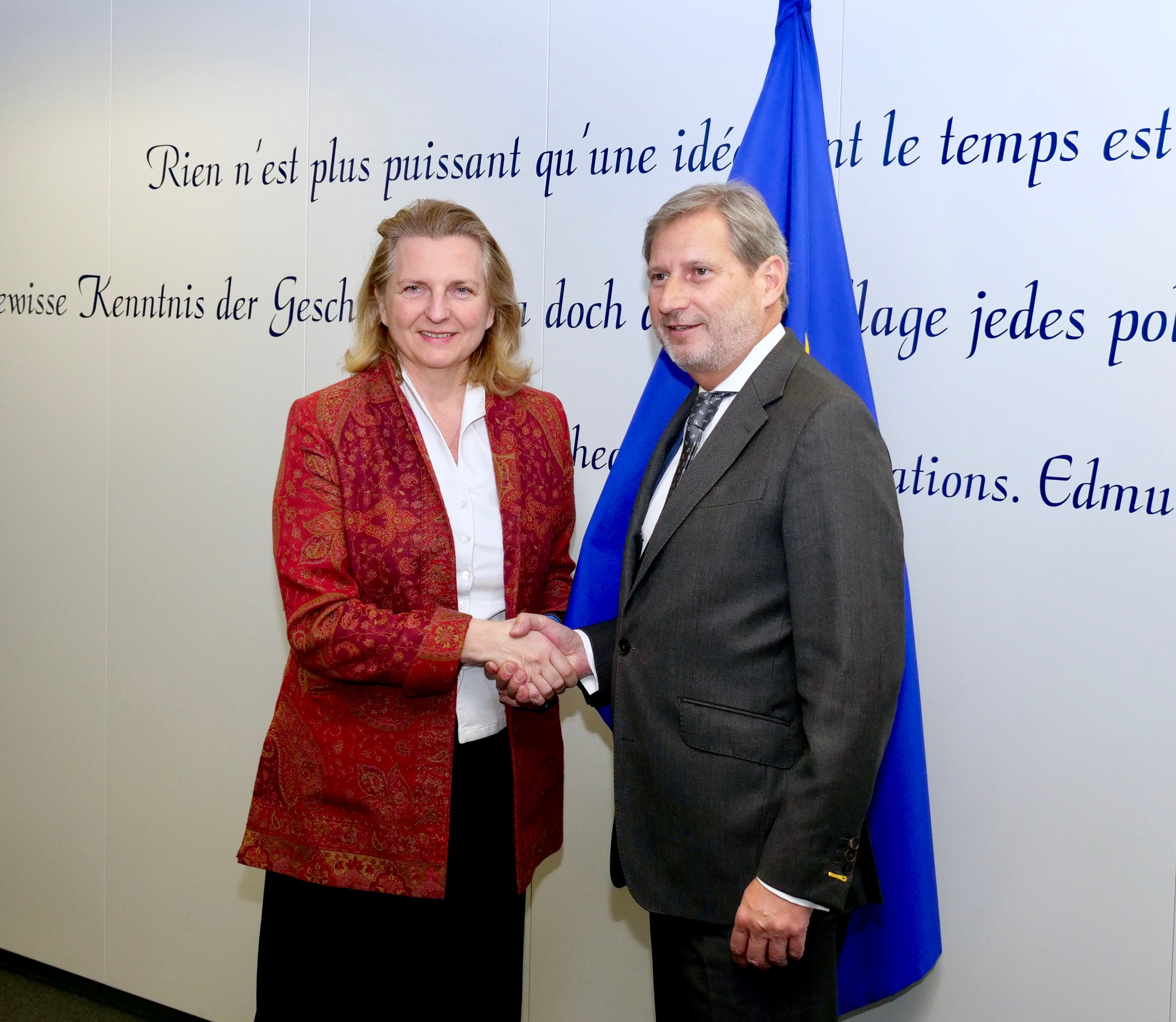
With Austrian Foreign Minister Karin Kneissl, January 2018

In the Juncker Commission, Hahn was nominated to oversee the Union's enlargement and neighbourhood policies, now managed by a single Directorate-General of the European Commission, DG NEAR.

In his new portfolio, Commissioner Hahn launched, together with High Representative Federica Mogherini, a comprehensive reform of the European Neighbourhood Policy (ENP), as mandated by Commission President Jean-Claude Juncker.

As Commissioner for Enlargement and Neighbourhood, Hahn oversaw the Union's response to the Syrian and Libyan civil wars and the war in Ukraine. He also oversaw, together with his colleagues, the EU's emergency response to the refugee crisis along the Balkan route, and managed the relations with Turkey before and after the failed 2016 coup, including in terms of assistance to the Syrian refugees based on the EU-Turkey deal.

On 24 November 2016 Johannes Hahn signed the agreement on financing the European Union Anti-Corruption Initiative in Ukraine.

When European Commissioner for Regional Policy Corina Crețu stepped down from the European Commission to take up her seat in the European Parliament following the 2019 elections, the commission's President of the European Commission Jean-Claude Juncker announced that her portfolio would be transferred to Hahn. Shortly after, Austria's interim Chancellor Brigitte Bierlein announced her government's intention to put forward Hahn for a third term as the country's representative in the European Commission.

== Other activities ==
- European Investment Bank (EIB), Member of the Appointment Advisory Committee (since 2025)

== Honours ==
- – Grand Decoration of Honour in Gold with Sash for Services to the Republic of Austria.
- – Order of Honour for the significant contribution to strengthening the collaboration between the Republic of Moldova and the European Union.

== Personal life ==
In 1979, Hahn was diagnosed with cancer and until 1999, he had three relapses.

Hahn is a separated father of one son, born in 1988. In 2022 he married former vice-chancellor Susanne Riess.

== Notes ==
Political offices
Preceded by Benita Ferrero-Waldner	Austrian European Commissioner; 2010–2024	Succeeded by Magnus Brunner
Preceded by Paweł Samecki	European Commissioner for Regional Policy; 2010–2014	Succeeded by Corina Crețu
Preceded by Štefan Füle as European Commissioner for Enlargement and European Neighbourhood Policy	European Commissioner for European Neighbourhood Policy and Enlargement Negotiations; 2014–2019	Succeeded by Olivér Várhelyi
Preceded by Corina Crețu	European Commissioner for Regional Policy; Acting; 2019	Succeeded by Elisa Ferreira as European Commissioner for Cohesion and Reform
Preceded by Günther Oettinger as European Commissioner for Budget and Human Resources	European Commissioner for Budget and Administration; 2019–2024	Succeeded by ?
