= Andris Piebalgs =

Latvian politician and diplomat

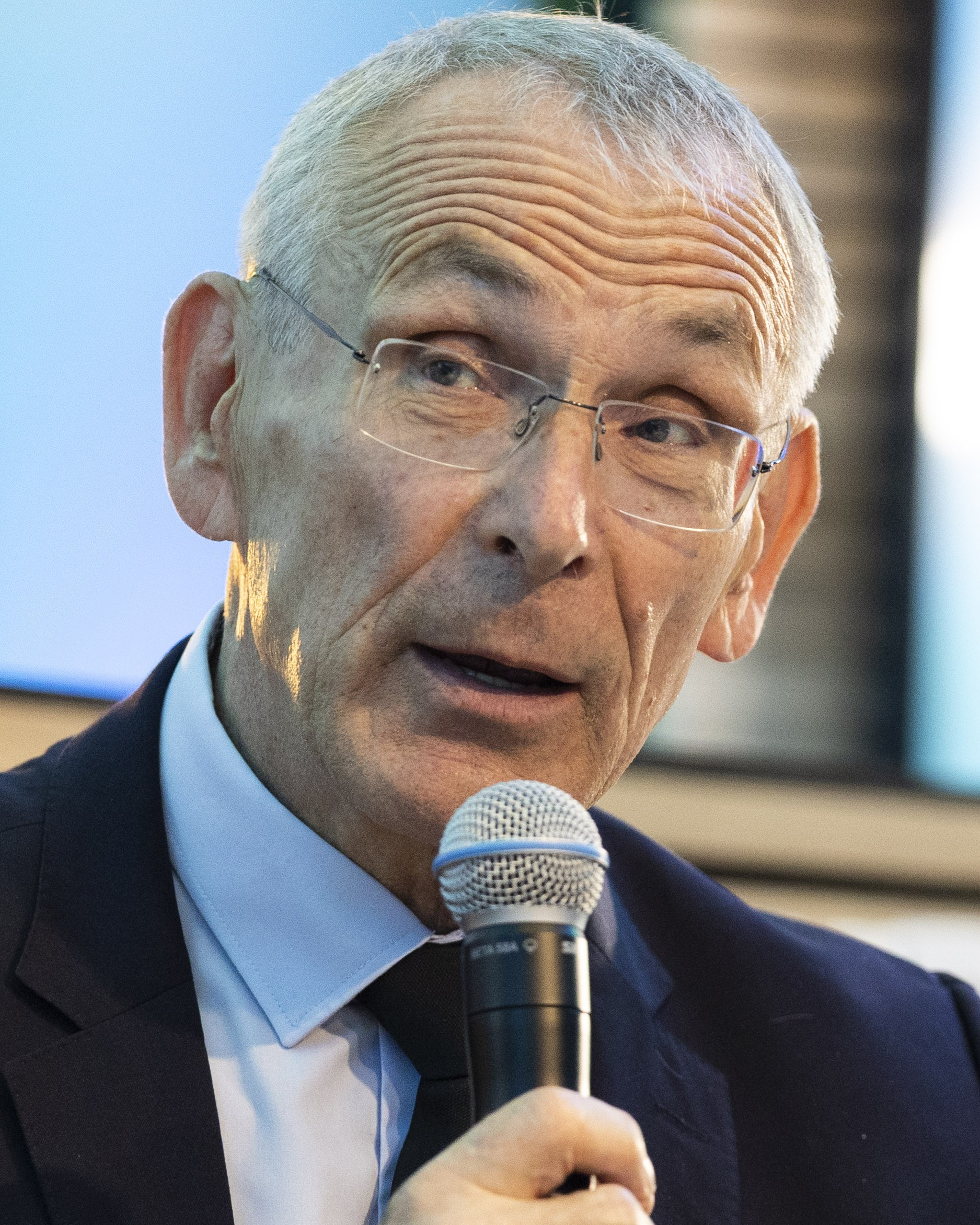
- Piebalgs in 2026

European Commissioner for Development
- In office 9 February 2010 – 1 November 2014
- President: José Manuel Barroso
- Preceded by: Karel De Gucht (Development and Humanitarian Aid)
- Succeeded by: Neven Mimica (International Cooperation and Development)

European Commissioner for Energy
- In office 22 November 2004 – 9 February 2010
- President: José Manuel Barroso
- Preceded by: Loyola de Palacio (Energy and Transport)
- Succeeded by: Günther Oettinger

Leader of Unity
- In office 4 June 2016 – 19 August 2017
- Preceded by: Solvita Āboltiņa
- Succeeded by: Arvils Ašeradens

Personal details
- Born: 17 September 1957 (age 69) Valmiera, Latvian SSR, Soviet Union
- Party: Communist Party (Before 1991); Latvian Way (1993–2007); Latvia's First Party/Latvian Way (2007–2011); Independent (2011–2016); Unity (2016–)
- Education: University of Latvia
- Andris Piebalgs's voice Piebalgs discussing the Millennium Development Goals; Recorded 16 April 2010

Andris Piebalgs (born 17 September 1957) is a Latvian politician and diplomat who served as European Commissioner for Development at the European Commission from 2010 until 2014. Between 2004 and 2009 he served as Commissioner for Energy. Between 4 June 2016 and 19 August 2017, he served as the leader of the Unity party.

== Career ==
Andris Piebalgs was born on 17 September 1957 in Valmiera, Latvia. Piebalgs is a graduate in Physics from the University of Latvia. Andris Piebalgs is an experienced Latvian politician who occupied key positions in both national and European political fields. Earlier in his career, while Latvia was still part of the Soviet Union, Andris Piebalgs worked as a teacher and was the headmaster of the 1st Secondary School of Valmiera (1980–1990). He also served as director of the department in the Ministry of Education in Latvia. He was a member of Communist Party of Soviet Union from 1979.

In 1988, Latvian People's Front, an organisation that united more than 200,000 people, was established. Supporters of Latvian self-determination gained victory in the March 1990 parliamentary election. It was the first time since the Soviet occupation that candidates from various political parties were allowed to take part. On 7 May 1990, Andris Piebalgs was appointed as Minister of Education in the new Government, and one year later, in August 1991, Latvia regained full independence. Andris Piebalgs' main task was then to put in place the first independent education system in Latvia.

In 1993, Andris Piebalgs won a seat in the Latvian Parliament, when the first elections after the restoration of independence were held according to the Latvian election law. He served as the chairman of the budget and finance committee until 1994. In September 1994, he became Latvia's Minister of Finance and deputy prime minister.

From 1995 until 2003, he worked in the Latvian Diplomatic service. Andris Piebalgs first served as the ambassador of Latvia in Estonia (1995–1997), where he helped to solve the sea border issue between the two states. In 1997 he became the Latvian Ambassador to the EU. In this capacity he helped to establish Latvia as the EU candidate country and led the accession negotiations, which resulted in Latvia's successful accession to the EU in 2004.

From 2003 to 2004, he was appointed Deputy Secretary of State for EU affairs at the Ministry of Foreign Affairs of Latvia. His role was instrumental in coordinating Latvia's position in the European Council and all Council formations. At the time, he also established the new development assistance policy for Latvia.

In addition to his native Latvian he is fluent in English, German, French, and Russian, and has basic knowledge of Estonian.

== European Commission ==
During the first Barroso Commission, starting in November 2004, he was the European Commissioner for Energy. In that capacity, he led the development of a more competitive, sustainable and secure European energy system, which is one of the crowning achievements of the Barroso I Commission. In doing so, he was instrumental in propelling EU energy issues into the centre of EU policy-making. In recognition of his leadership in European energy policy, The Economist magazine honoured him with the title "Eurocrat of the Year" in 2007. In 2009, Andris Piebalgs received the "Diamond Prize" from the Regional Chamber of Commerce in Katowice (Poland) for his work in developing a cohesive European Energy Policy for the further generations. In 2009, the Energy Efficiency Global Forum presented him the Energy Efficiency Visionary Awards for his "outstanding contributions to the advancement of energy efficiency".

He was twice appointed Acting Commissioner for Financial Programming and the Budget in Janusz Lewandowski's stead, from 19 April 2014 – 25 May 2014 while he was on electoral campaign leave for the 2014 elections to the European Parliament and from 1 July 2014 – 16 July 2014 after he took up his seat.

=== Selection hearing ===
Energy

On 15 November 2004 when questioned by the European Parliament as the Commissioner Designate for Energy, Piebalgs stressed the importance of environmental considerations in energy policy, and announced his intention to pursue a policy framework based on limiting growth in demand for energy while increasing diversity of supply.

He was cautious on the question of support for nuclear energy, and said that he favoured an EU-wide regulatory framework for nuclear safety as a way of increasing the industry's transparency and levels of public acceptance. He also said that, "strict application of provisions of the Euratom Treaty is essential."

Piebalgs expressed his unhappiness there was not yet a 'level playing field' for competition in the energy and gas industries across the union. He assigned high priority to reducing overall energy demand, especially by improving the energy efficiency of buildings, promoting the long-term development of hydrogen as a fuel source, improving the competitiveness of renewable energy sources through economic measures, and supporting the development of nuclear fusion and the ITER project.

Following his hearing Piebalgs received strong backing from across the political spectrum, including the Greens, who had previously described László Kovács's performance on energy issues as "an offense to the parliament".

Development

Hearing of the Commissioner Designate for Development took place on 11 January 2010 in the European Parliament. During three hours members of the European Parliament (MEPs) from Committees of Development, Foreign Affairs and International Trade questioned him about his political priorities and key aims of development policy. Commissioner Designate stressed that his main priorities in the office will be to achieve the Millennium Development Goals (MDG), ensure that EU Members States honour their commitments in regard to the Official Development Assistance (ODA) and to make our international aid more efficient.

Piebalgs underlined the need to take advantage of the creation of the post of a foreign policy High Representative and External Action Service, without, however "allowing development policy to be seen in any way as simply a tool to achieve wider political goals for the EU". He also stressed the need "to maintain the EU's role as a champion of the developing world."

== Other activities ==
From 2012 to 2013, Piebalgs served – alongside Ellen Johnson Sirleaf, David Cameron and others – on the High-level Panel on Post-2015 Development Agenda, an advisory board established by United Nations Secretary-General Ban Ki-moon to develop the global development agenda beyond 2015, the target date for the Millennium Development Goals.

In addition, Piegbals has held various honorary positions, including:

- Friends of Europe, member of the board of trustees
- Friends of the Global Fund, member of the board

== Personal life ==
Andris Piebalgs is married and has three children. During his free time he likes to play tennis and to go skiing.

Political offices
Preceded by Sandra Kalniete	Latvian European Commissioner; 2004–2014	Succeeded by Valdis Dombrovskis
Preceded by Loyola de Palacio as European Commissioner for Energy and Transport	European Commissioner for Energy; 2004–2010	Succeeded by Günther Oettinger
Preceded by Karel De Gucht as European Commissioner for Development and Humanitarian Aid	European Commissioner for Development; 2010–2014	Succeeded by Neven Mimica as European Commissioner for International Cooperation and Development
