= World Bank-China ranking controversy =

The World Bank-China ranking controversy refers to the alleged manipulation of China’s ranking in the World Bank’s annual Doing Business report by World Bank officials while they were negotiating a multibillion-dollar capital increase from China.

On September 18, the World Bank said it was suspending Doing Business ranking over data irregularities.

== See also ==
- Kristalina Georgieva
- World Bank Group
