= Quicksilver (company) =

British amusement arcade and gambling machine company

- Industry: Gambling
- Headquarters: UK
- Number of locations: 200+
- Area served: UK
- Products: Amusement arcade, gambling machines
- Parent: Novomatic

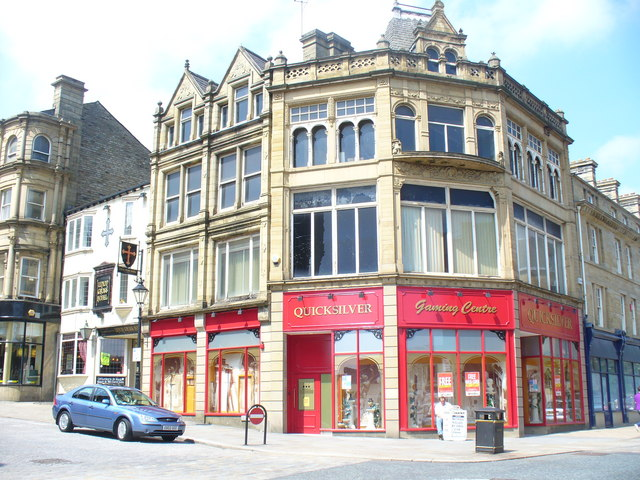
A Quicksilver branch in Halifax, England, in 2009 with the old branding.

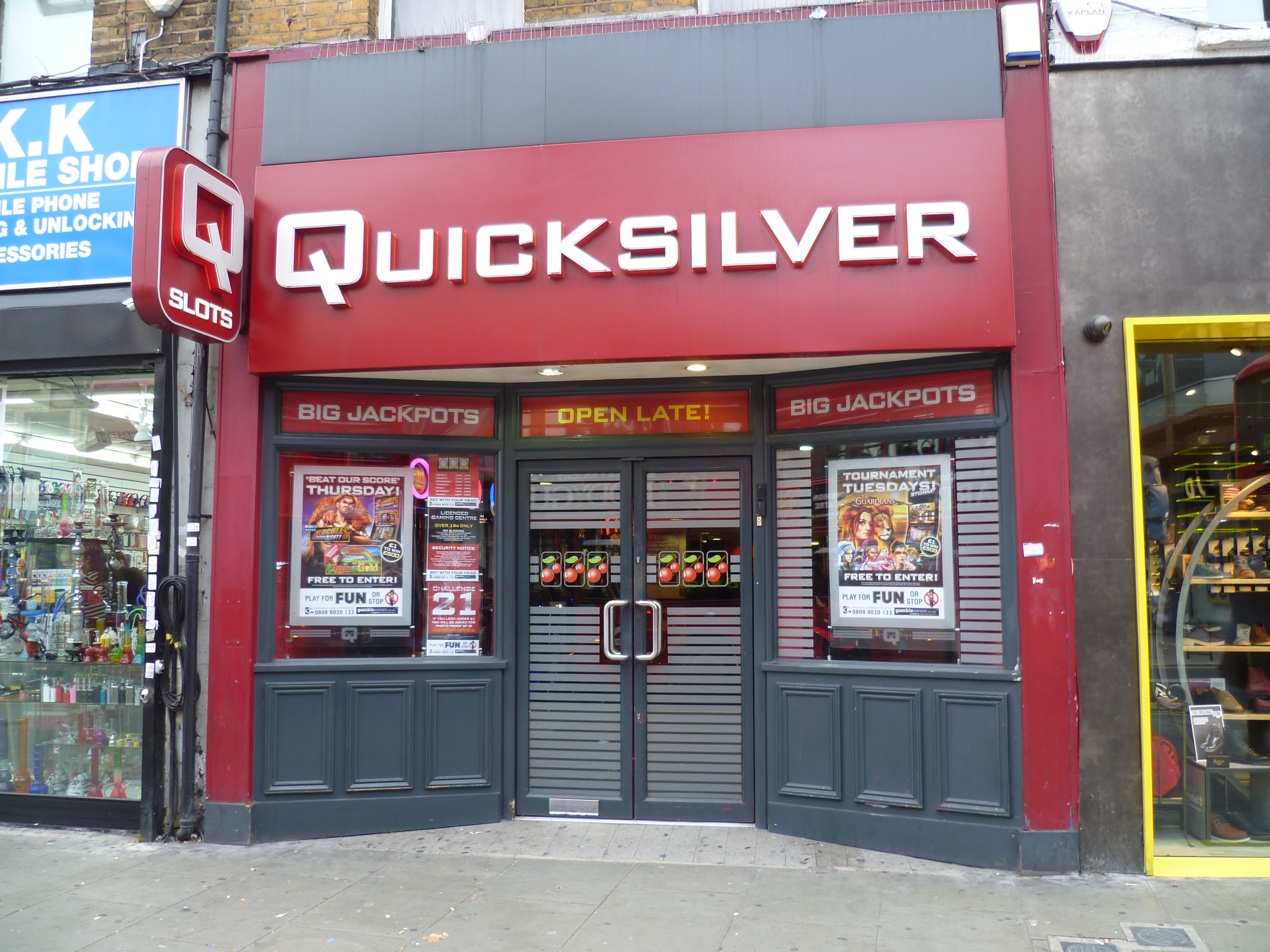
A Quicksilver branch in Wood Green, London.

Quicksilver is a British amusement arcade and gambling machine company. It is the UK's largest slot gambling machine operator, with over 200 high street outlets and about 10,000 gambling machines. Quicksilver describes itself as the "largest amusement business in the UK".

== Operations ==
In conjunction with their parent company, Talarius, they operate three high street brands across the UK, Quicksilver, Silvers and Winners, including eight at motorway service areas.

In 2007, the profitability of the firm was hit when the British government introduced a new taxation regime for gambling and a smoking ban on commercial premises but the company has since recovered.

Since 2012, Quicksilver have run the arcades at all Extra motorway service stations in the UK, and from 2013, the arcade at the Folkestone service station on the M20.

In 2013, Talarius and Quicksilver left the trade body BACTA after becoming dissatisfied with the direction it was taking but rejoined in 2014 following the appointment of John White as chief executive.

In September 2015, Playtech reached a deal to provide its software to 92 of Talarius' Quicksilver-branded UK high street "adult gaming centres" (AGCs). In July 2016, Gamestec a subsidiary of Novomatic, extended their logistics contract to provide "extensive network and infrastructure capacity" for a third year to over 180 Quicksilver outlets.

== Ownership ==
Quicksilver is part of Talarius, which was owned by the Australian Tatts Group from 2008 until it was sold to Austrian company Novomatic in June 2016.
