= David Lipton =

American economist

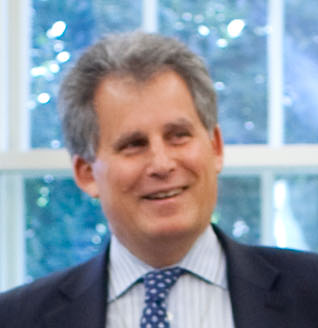
- Lipton in 2010

Managing Director of the International Monetary Fund
- Acting; September 12, 2019 – October 1, 2019
- Preceded by: Christine Lagarde
- Succeeded by: Kristalina Georgieva

Personal details
- Born: November 9, 1953 (age 72) Boston, Massachusetts, U.S.
- Education: Wesleyan University (BA); Harvard University (MA, PhD)

David Lipton (born November 9, 1953) is an American economist who served as the Acting Managing Director of the International Monetary Fund from July 2, 2019, following Christine Lagarde's nomination as President of the European Central Bank, until Kristalina Georgieva was appointed in the office on October 1, 2019. Prior to this, Lipton had been serving as the IMF's First Deputy Managing Director since September 2011. Lipton has been featured in, and interviewed by, numerous publications including The Financial Times, Euromoney, Bloomberg News, and The Guardian.

== Life and work ==
David Lipton was born on November 9, 1953, in Boston, Massachusetts, and received an undergraduate degree from Wesleyan University in 1975, followed by a PhD in economics from Harvard University in 1982, under the supervision of Jeffrey Sachs. He then started working for the International Monetary Fund, after which he joined Jeffrey Sachs advising governments of transition economies, such as Russia, Poland, and Slovenia, also writing frequently on the topic. He subsequently started working for the Clinton administration in 1997 as Under Secretary of the Treasury for International Affairs, from which position he worked on the Asian financial crisis. Upon leaving the public sector, Lipton joined a hedge fund (Moore Capital Management), followed by a stint at Citibank where he became Head of Global Country Risk Management.

Prior to joining the IMF, David Lipton served as Special Assistant to President Barack Obama, while also being part of the National Economic Council and National Security Council at the White House.

In 2021 Lipton was named a senior counselor to Treasury Secretary Janet Yellen, focusing on policy work with US allies and working with the G7 and G20 summits.

Diplomatic posts
Preceded by Christine Lagarde	Managing Director of the International Monetary Fund; Acting; 2019	Succeeded by Kristalina Georgieva
