= Andrzej Sadoś =

Polish diplomat

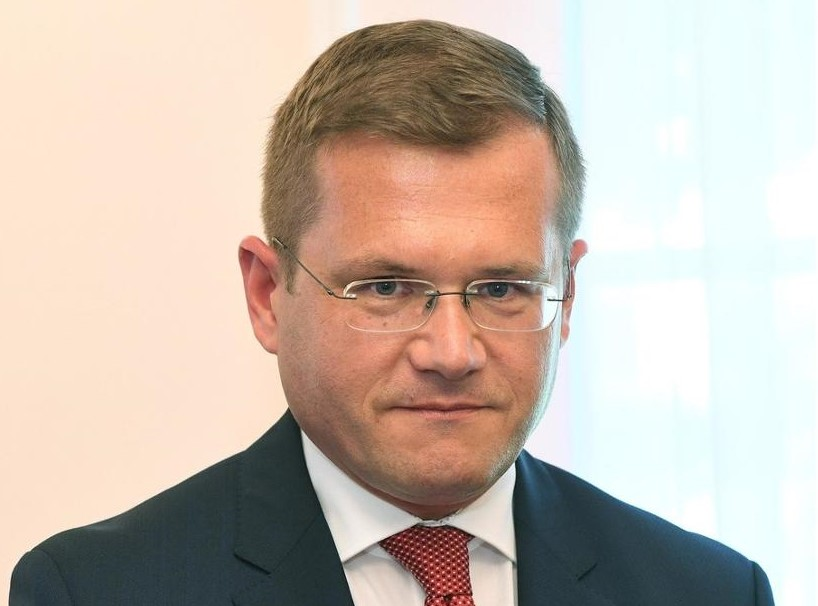

8th Poland Ambassador to the European Union
- In office 2018 – 13 December 2023
- Preceded by: Jarosław Starzyk
- Succeeded by: Piotr Serafin

Personal details
- Born: 17 March 1972 (age 54) Warsaw
- Education: University of Warsaw
- Profession: diplomat

Andrzej Marek Sadoś (born 17 March 1972, Warsaw) is a Polish diplomat who served as the Permanent Representative of Poland to the European Union between 2018 and 2023.

== Biography ==
Andrzej Sadoś studied law at the Eötvös Loránd University in Budapest (1990–1992). He graduated from the Faculty of Law at the University of Warsaw in 1997 (also studying at Hertford College, Oxford in 1996), and in 1998 he completed diplomatic and consular training at the Ministry of Foreign Affairs. In 2000 he obtained a diploma from Wilton Park (2000).

Sadoś started his career as a press officer of the NSZZ Solidarność parliamentary group at the Senate of Poland in 1995. He joined the Polish diplomatic service in 1997, posted at the mission to the United Nations in Geneva (1998–1999, 2001–2006) and at the embassy in Budapest (2000–2001). Between May 2006 and April 2007 Sadoś was the spokesperson of the foreign ministry. Then for few months, till September 2007, he was under-secretary of State at the chancellery of the Prime Minister of the Republic of Poland, Jarosław Kaczyński and, from September to November 2007, at the Foreign Ministry.

From September 2008 to July 2009 Sadoś served as deputy head of the Polish embassy in Bern, and from 2009 until July 2012 as permanent representative in Geneva.

Between July 2012 and the end of 2017 Sadoś was head of programs in Eastern Europe for the International Catholic Migration Commission in Geneva.

Since January 2018 Andrzej Sadoś serves at the Permanent Representation of Poland to the European Union, first as chargé d'affaires, and later on as a Permanent Representative. Sadoś is considered to have always "stuck closely" to the line of the ruling party, Law and Justice. He finished his term on 13 December 2023.

Sadoś is deemed to be a "close friend" of European Commissioner Oliver Varhelyi and has been touted for the position of Director-General of the commission's DG NEAR.

He can speak English, German, French, Hungarian and Russian languages. He is married, with children.
