= Agnieszka Bartol =

Polish official

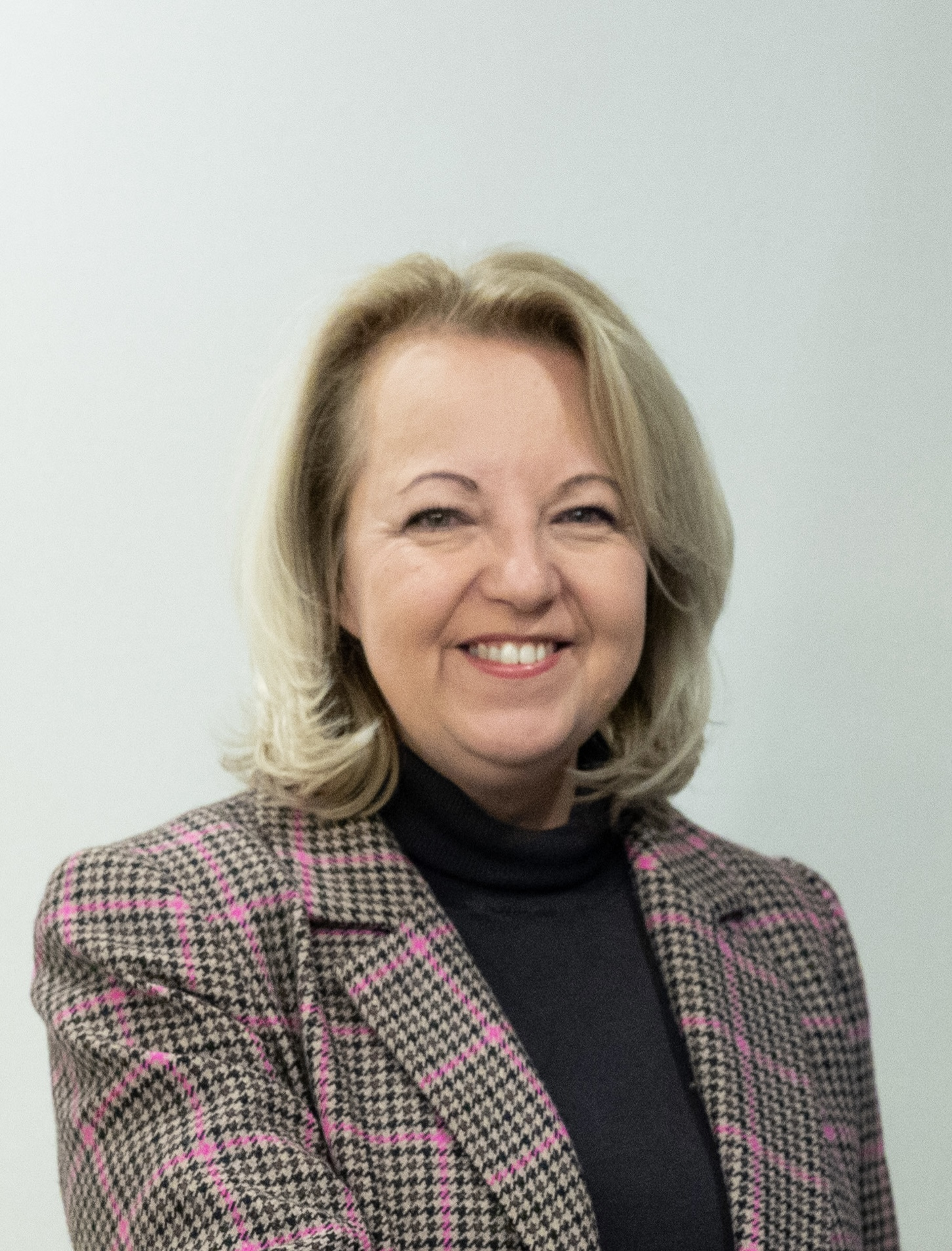
- (2024)

Secretary of State in the Chancellery of the Prime Minister of Poland
- In office 16 February 2024 – 19 October 2024

Permanent Representative of Poland to the European Union
- Incumbent
- Assumed office 22 October 2024
- Preceded by: Piotr Serafin

Personal details
- Born: Agnieszka Bartol; 10 July 1972 (age 54) Warsaw, Poland
- Children: 2
- Education: College of Europe; Nancy-Université
- Occupation: Official; Diplomat; Civil servant; Politician

Agnieszka Bartol (formerly Bartol-Saurel; born 12 January 1974) is a Polish politician and official. Since 22 October 2024 she serves as acting Permanent Representative of Poland to the European Union. Prior to that, she was Secretary of State in the Chancellery of the Prime Minister of Poland (2024).

== Life ==
Bartol graduated from the Nancy-Université and the College of Europe. She worked as administrative staff of the latter one (1998–2000). From 2000 to 2002, she worked at the Office of the Committee for European Integration (UKIE). In 2002, she became a member of the Secretariat of the European Convention. Next, she joined the Council of the European Union team where she was in charge of the Treaty of Lisbon. Between 2003 and 2024, she worked for the Council of the European Union, specializing in the areas of, among others, cohesion policy, financial services, institutional affairs, the multi-annual financial framework. In 2016, she became Head of the Cabinet of the Secretary General of the Council of the European Union and a member of the General Secretariat Advisory Board and Audit Committee. On 1 May 2022, she took the post of the Director General of Communications and Information in the General Secretariat. Between 16 February and 19 October 2024, she served as Secretary of State in the Chancellery of the Prime Minister of Poland responsible for relations with the European Union. On 22 October 2024, she succeeded Piotr Serafin as acting Permanent Representative of Poland to the European Union.

== Personal life ==
Bartol is married with two daughters. Besides her native Polish, she speaks French, English, Italian and Russian.
