= Jacek Dominik =

Polish civil servant

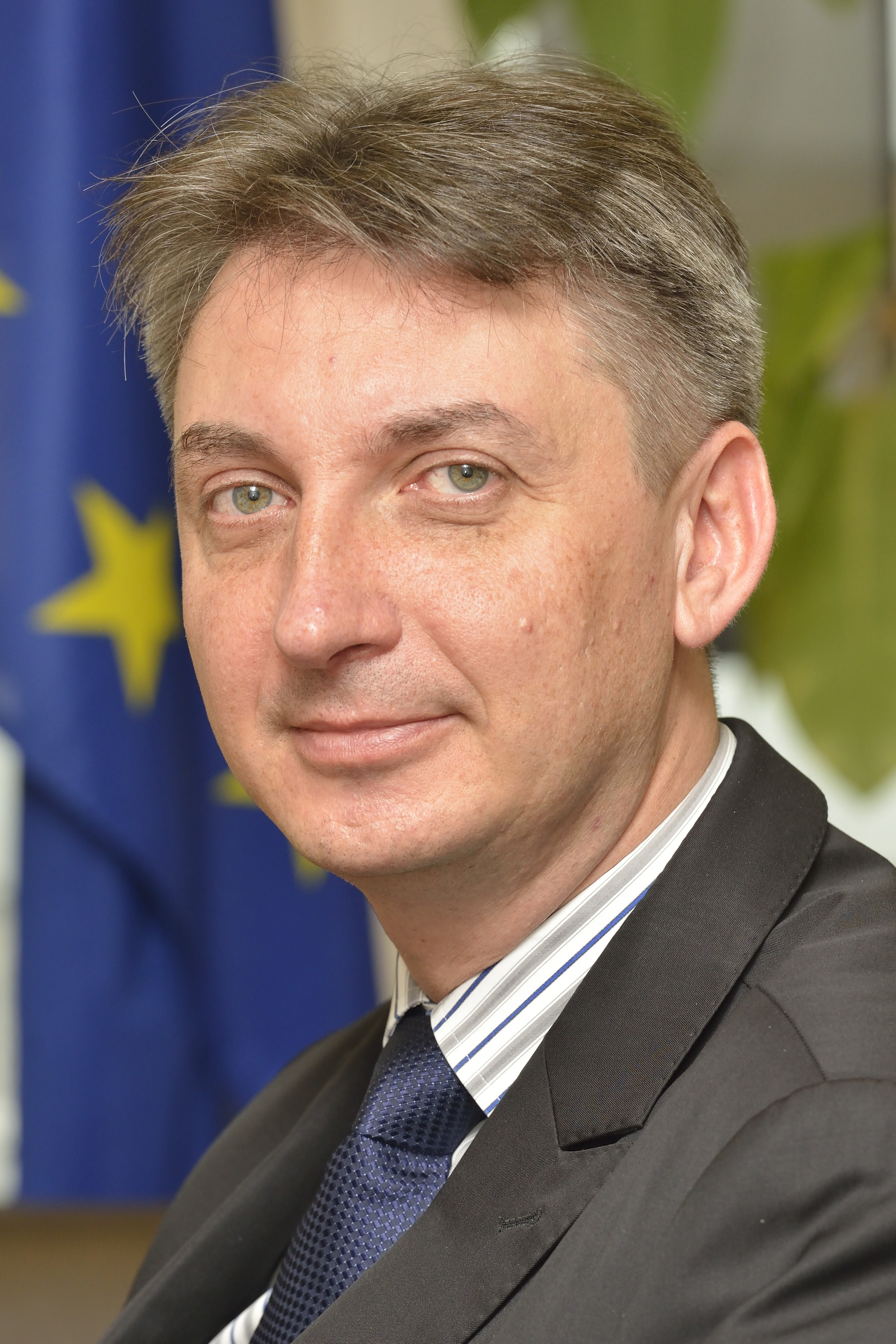
- Official portrait, 2014

European Commissioner for Financial Programming and the Budget
- In office 16 July 2014 – 1 November 2014
- President: José Durão Barroso
- Preceded by: Janusz Lewandowski
- Succeeded by: Kristalina Georgieva

Personal details
- Born: 15 July 1969 (age 57) Piaseczno, Poland
- Education: Warsaw University

Jacek Dominik (born 15 July 1969 in Piaseczno) is a Polish civil servant who served briefly as a European Commissioner in 2014.

At Warsaw University, Dominik took a bachelor's degree in law and administration, where he also later earned a post-graduate degree in law and economies of the European Communities. From 1993 to 1998 he was an official of the Ministry of Finance, before becoming a financial advisor to Poland's permanent representative to the European Union in 1998. He returned to Poland in 2004 to be an adviser to the Ministry of Finance, from 2004 to 2006, when he became an Under-Secretary of State in the Ministry of Finance. He was also a member of the Administrative Council of the Council of Europe Development Bank, an Alternate Governor of the European Bank for Reconstruction and Development and a Director of the European Investment Bank.

In the 2014 European Parliament election, four serving European Commissioners were elected as Members of the European Parliament (MEP)s, requiring their resignation from the Commission. One of the four was the Polish Commissioner Janusz Lewandowski. Dominik was appointed to succeed Lewandowski as Commissioner for Financial Programming and the Budget in the second Barroso Commission, holding the office from 16 July 2014 until the Commission's term ended on 1 November 2014.

Political offices
Preceded by Janusz Lewandowski	Polish European Commissioner; 2014	Succeeded by Elżbieta Bieńkowska
Preceded by Janusz Lewandowski	European Commissioner for Financial Programming and the Budget; 2014	Succeeded by Kristalina Georgieva
