= Kristalina Georgieva =

Bulgarian politician and economist

- Кристалина Георгиева
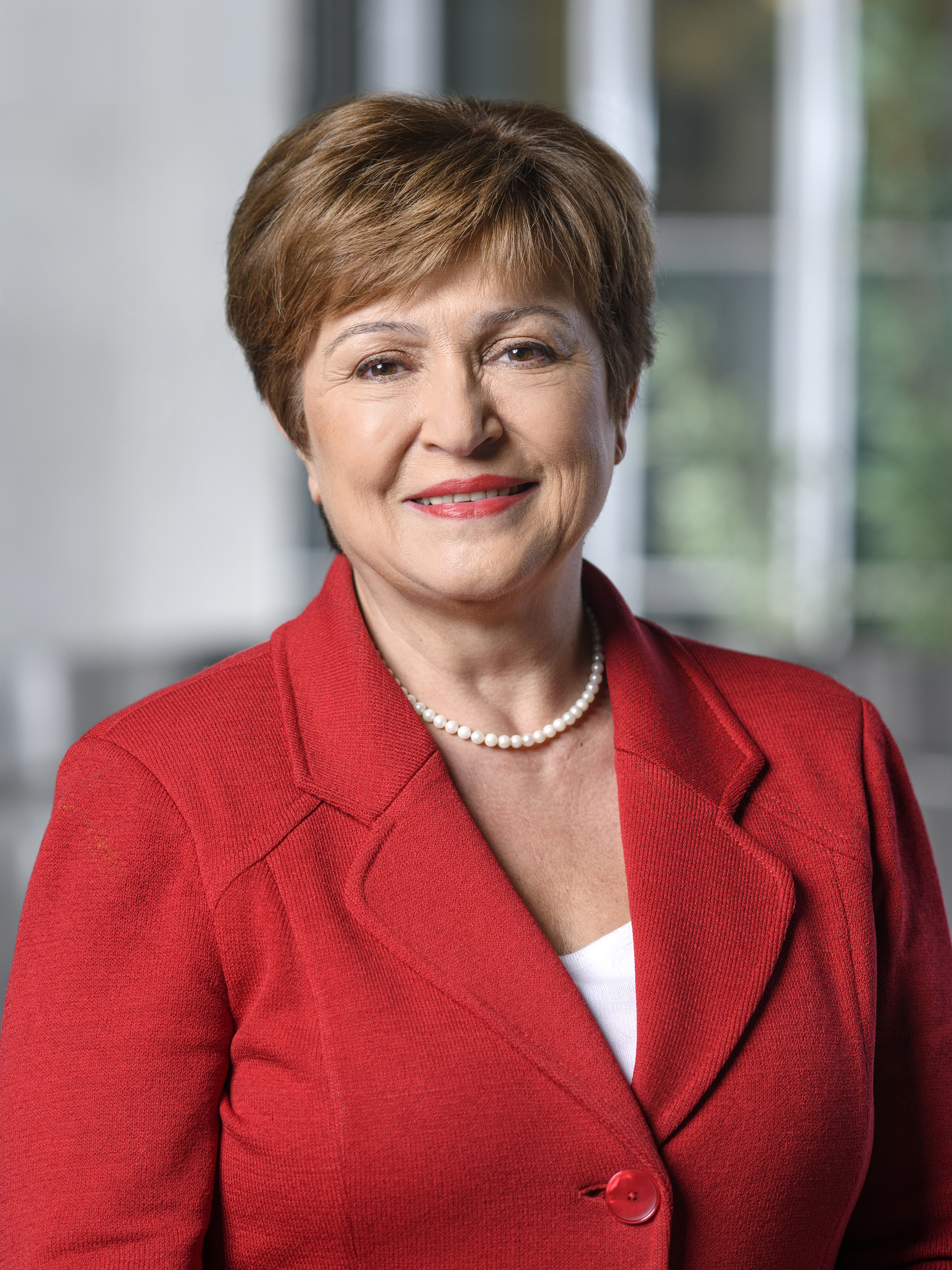
- Official portrait, 2019

12th Managing Director of the International Monetary Fund
- Incumbent
- Assumed office 1 October 2019
- Deputy: David Lipton; Geoffrey Okamoto; Gita Gopinath; Dan Katz
- Preceded by: Christine Lagarde

President of the World Bank Group
- Acting
- In office 1 February 2019 – 8 April 2019
- Preceded by: Jim Yong Kim
- Succeeded by: David Malpass

Chief Executive of the World Bank Group
- In office 2 January 2017 – 1 October 2019; On leave: 2 August 2019 – 1 October 2019
- President: Jim Yong Kim; David Malpass
- Preceded by: Position established
- Succeeded by: Position abolished

European Commissioner for Budget and Human Resources
- In office 1 November 2014 – 31 December 2016
- President: Jean-Claude Juncker
- Preceded by: Jacek Dominik
- Succeeded by: Günther Oettinger

European Commissioner for International Cooperation, Humanitarian Aid and Crisis Response
- In office 9 February 2010 – 1 November 2014
- President: José Manuel Barroso
- Preceded by: Karel De Gucht
- Succeeded by: Christos Stylianides

Personal details
- Born: Kristalina Ivanova Georgieva; 13 August 1953 (age 73) Sofia, Bulgaria
- Spouse: Kino Kinov
- Children: 1
- Education: University of National and World Economy (BA, MA, PhD)
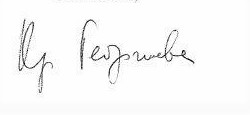
- Signature

Georgieva speaking at the 2024 World Economic Forum

Kristalina Ivanova Georgieva-Kinova (Bulgarian: Кристалина Иванова Георгиева-Кинова; née Georgieva; born 13 August 1953) is a Bulgarian economist who has served as the 12th managing director of the International Monetary Fund since 2019. She is the first person from an emerging market economy to lead the institution.

She began her career by teaching economics.

Serving as European Commissioner for International Cooperation, Humanitarian Aid, and Crisis Response from 2010 to 2014, Georgieva directed EU resources to aid those affected by crises including the 2010 Haiti earthquake. As vice-president of the European Commission for Budget and Human Resources from 2014 to 2016, she managed the EU's budget and staff through the aftermath of the Eurozone debt crisis and during the 2015 refugee crisis.

As the first chief executive officer of the World Bank from 2017 to 2019, Georgieva led significant reforms and secured the largest funding increase in the Bank's history, totaling $13 billion. She also served as Acting President of the World Bank Group in 2019. At the IMF, Georgieva helped steer the global economy through the COVID-19 pandemic, providing $1 trillion in liquidity and reserves, integrating climate considerations into IMF policies, and increasing financial and policy support to vulnerable countries. She was reappointed for a second term in 2024.

In 2021, during her tenure at the World Bank Group, an independent inquiry led by former US Attorney Ronald Machen and the law firm WilmerHale found she manipulated the World Bank's Doing Business report by instructing staff to alter data to inflate the rankings for China and Saudi Arabia. Her leadership of the IMF has also been criticized for being pro-authoritarian and providing forecasts of economic growth in Russia based on cherry-picked economic statistic releases following the Russian invasion of Ukraine.

Georgieva has been hailed for her work on gender equality and climate change. She was ranked 12th on the Forbes list of the World's 100 Most Powerful Women in 2023.

== Early life and education ==
Georgieva was born in Sofia to Ivan Stefanov Georgiev, a road worker and civil engineer, and Marinka Petrova Mihailova, a shopkeeper. Her great-grandfather was a prominent Bulgarian revolutionary, Ivan Karshovski.

Georgieva holds a PhD in economics and an MA in Political Economy and Sociology from the Karl Marx Higher Institute of Economics (now called University of National and World Economy) in Sofia. Her thesis was titled "Environmental Protection Policy and Economic Growth in the USA".

Georgieva was one of the first Bulgarian economists to study in the West before the fall of the Berlin Wall. In 1990, she published the first textbook in the Bulgarian language on microeconomics, explaining, in simple terms, how a market economy works. She was a post-doctoral research fellow in natural resource economics and environmental policy at the London School of Economics from 1987 to 1988, a Fulbright fellow at the Massachusetts Institute of Technology, and a visiting professor in Fiji at the University of the South Pacific.

Georgieva is fluent in Bulgarian, English, and Russian, and also speaks some French.

== Public service career ==
=== World Bank (1993–2010) ===
Georgieva joined the World Bank Group in 1993 as an environmental economist for Europe and Central Asia. In 1997, Georgieva helped manage the team that helped phase out leaded gasoline in Central and Eastern Europe. From 2004 to 2007 she was the institution's director and resident representative in the Russian Federation, based in Moscow. In 2007, she returned to Washington DC to become Director for Sustainable Development in charge of policy and lending operations in infrastructure, urban development, agriculture, environment, and social development, including support to fragile and conflict affected countries.

She was appointed vice president and corporate secretary in 2008. In this role, she served as the interlocutor between the World Bank Group's senior management, its Board of Directors, and its shareholder countries. During that time, she worked on the bank's governance reform and accompanying capital increase. In January 2010, Georgieva announced her intention to resign from this post to join the European Commission.

=== European Commission (2010–2016) ===
Georgieva's confirmation hearing took place at the European Parliament on 4 February 2010. She faced questions over her suitability for the portfolio. Georgieva identified Haiti as a priority, especially the need to provide shelter and health services and to restore the functions and services of the government, so as to start work on reconstruction and long-term development.

Other key issues raised in discussions with members of the European Parliament (MEPs) included improving co-ordination within the EU and European Commission, and between humanitarian and military players in order to meet the dual challenge posed by expanding needs and shrinking budgets. The need to improve the effectiveness of EU actions and for better response capacity had also been stressed, together with the establishment of the European Voluntary Humanitarian Corps.

Georgieva received a warm response from MEPs, with British S&D MEP Michael Cashman praising her "honesty and deep breadth of knowledge". She was applauded by committee members when she told British ECR Group MEP Nirj Deva that she would stand up for the interests of the EU and be an independent mind.

Slovenian ALDE Group MEP Ivo Vajgl also praised her, saying, "Let me compliment you on your peaceful manner and the confidence you are exuding today." Her performance at the hearing was widely publicized in Bulgaria and broadcast live on many national media, where it was seen as a question of the restoration of national honor following Jeleva's unsuccessful hearing.

The second college of the Barroso Commission, including Georgieva, was approved by the European Parliament on 9 February 2010 by a vote of 488–137 with 72 abstentions, and she took office the following day.

==== Vice President for International Cooperation, Humanitarian Aid, and Crisis Response ====
In this role, Georgieva worked to direct the available EU resources towards helping people in need: those caught up in humanitarian crises and those affected by disasters ranging from catastrophic earthquakes to pollution spills. Immediately after taking office she took responsibility for coordinating the EU's humanitarian response to the 2010 earthquake in Haiti and as a result the EU became the primary humanitarian donor.

Georgieva tripled funding for the refugee crisis in Europe. She launched the European Emergency Response and Coordination Centre to strengthen the EU's disaster response capacity by focusing on preparedness and prevention.

She was involved in coordinating the EU response to the earthquake in Chile and the floods in Pakistan. Amid the Southeast Europe floods in May 2014, Georgieva coordinated post-disaster assistance and helped prepare Serbia's request for aid of as much as €1 billion a year.

In May 2015, United Nations Secretary-General Ban Ki-moon appointed her and Nazrin Shah of Perak as co-chairs of the High-Level Panel on Humanitarian Financing, an initiative aimed at preparing recommendations for the 2016 World Humanitarian Summit. The High Level Panel on Humanitarian Financing secured the adoption of a much more effective system to meet the needs of record numbers of vulnerable people.

==== Vice President for Budget and Human Resources ====
In 2014, news media reported that the ambassadors of several Western EU countries early on indicated their countries' support for Georgieva to be nominated for the incoming Juncker Commission, indicating that she might get the post of High Representative of the Union for Foreign Affairs and Security Policy.

Her candidacy had been uncertain because of political infighting in Bulgaria. The collapse of the Socialist government, however, cleared the path for her nomination. By August, Georgi Bliznashki, Bulgaria's interim prime minister, announced her candidacy to replace Britain's Catherine Ashton.

Incoming European Commission President Jean-Claude Juncker instead assigned the post of vice-president for Budget and Human Resources to Georgieva, with experienced EU civil servant Florika Fink-Hooijer as her chef de cabinet. She was thus the most senior technocrat in the Juncker Commission, the only one of the seven vice-presidents never to have served as a national minister.

In this role, sometimes referred to as the Commission's chief operating officer, she oversaw the EU's €161 billion budget, 33,000 staff, and reporting to the European Parliament, the Council, and the European Court of Auditors on how the budget of the European Union is spent. Within months of taking her new position, Georgieva was able to negotiate a several-billion-dollar budget increase for 2014.

Georgieva set up the European Solidarity Corps in December 2016, which replaced the European Voluntary Service. Georgieva also worked to increase the representation of women in the Commission's senior and middle management.

=== World Bank (2017–2019) ===
After running for secretary-general of the United Nations, on 28 October 2016, the World Bank announced that Georgieva would become the first CEO of the International Bank for Reconstruction and Development and the International Development Association starting on 2 January 2017.

On 21 April 2018, World Bank shareholders endorsed an ambitious package of measures that included a $13 billion paid-in capital increase, a series of internal reforms, and a set of policy measures that greatly strengthened the global poverty-fighting institution's ability to scale up resources and deliver on its mission in areas of the world that needed the most assistance. Georgieva played a key role in securing this increase, the largest in the bank's history.

On 7 January 2019, it was announced that World Bank Group President Kim would be stepping down and Georgieva would assume the role of interim president of the World Bank Group on 1 February 2019.

In October 2021, the International Monetary Fund's executive board initiated an investigation that Georgieva manipulated the Doing Business Report in 2018 during her tenure as World Bank chief. The board later determined that the investigation "did not conclusively demonstrate" that she acted wrongly, and expressed confidence in Georgieva's leadership.

=== International Monetary Fund (2019–present) ===
On 29 September 2019, Georgieva was named managing director of the International Monetary Fund (IMF), to succeed Christine Lagarde (who was leaving to become president of the European Central Bank). Georgieva was the only candidate for the job and the first person from an emerging economy to serve in the position. IMF tradition was that candidates could not be older than 65 at the start of their term, but following pressure from French President Emmanuel Macron, the rule was waived for Georgieva.

Georgieva's five-year term began on 1 October 2019.

Soon, she led the institution's $1 trillion response to the COVID-19 pandemic and cost-of-living crisis following Russia's invasion of Ukraine. This included lending to nearly 100 countries and the allocation of $650 billion of Special Drawing Rights, the IMF's reserve asset. Low-income countries received debt relief and a five-fold increase in lending.

Amid the pandemic, she co-founded and co-chaired the Multilateral Leaders Task Force on COVID-19 Vaccines, Therapeutics, and Diagnostics for Developing Countries. The Task Force worked to support delivery of COVID-19 tools to low-and middle-income countries and to mobilize relevant stakeholders and national leaders to remove critical finance and trade roadblocks.

Georgieva led the creation of the $40 billion IMF Resilience and Sustainability Trust and moved to integrate climate into the Fund's work more broadly.

In a fraught geopolitical atmosphere, Georgieva increased the IMF's work on the impacts of geoeconomic fragmentation. To shore up the Fund's finances, she brokered agreement on the IMF's 16th quota review and completed a round of fundraising for the Poverty Reduction and Growth Trust (PGRT), which supports the IMF's concessional lending operations.

She has also increased the IMF's support to members on women's economic empowerment and emerging areas of macroeconomic policy, such as the digitalization of finance and generative artificial intelligence.

On 12 April 2024, Georgieva was reappointed by the IMF executive board to serve for a second five-year term. She was the sole candidate. The managing director has underlined the need for increasing the global economic role the fund performs in unstable times.

==== Allegations of inflating rankings for China and Saudi Arabia ====
Georgieva's professional ethics were called into question during her tenure at the World Bank Group, due to a 2021 independent inquiry, led by former US Attorney for Washington D.C. Ronald Machen and the law firm WilmerHale, which found she manipulated the World Bank's Doing Business report. The investigation found that Georgieva instructed staff to alter data to inflate the rankings for China and Saudi Arabia. According to Center for Global Development Senior Fellow Justin Sandefeur, "Allegations cover incidents spanning the tenures of two World Bank presidents, Obama-nominee Jim Kim and Trump-nominee David Malpass, with a leading role for Kristalina Georgieva who now runs the IMF."

==== Allegations of authoritarian leanings ====
After it was announced that the International Monetary Fund would become the first major international financial body to officially return to Russia since the Russian invasion of Ukraine, a Fortune article by Jeffrey Sonnenfeld, Tymofiy Mylovanov, Nataliia Shapoval, and Steven Tian in September 2024 outlined what it described as "pro-authoritarian impulses of the IMF and its tolerance to blunt violations of international law by Russia" under Georgieva's leadership, and that Georgieva's "anti-Western bias can no longer be swept under the carpet". The same article also noted that the "IMF's pro-authoritarian impulses became especially pronounced after the invasion of Ukraine", with the IMF without visiting Russia and based on Vladimir Putin's cherry-picked economic statistic releases inexplicably provided forecast of economic growth in Russia which exceeded even the Russian Central Bank's projections, leading the public to question the ability of Western economic sanctions to dent the Russian economy even before those sanctions were fully implemented.

Following objections by several of Ukraine's European allies, the IMF indefinitely postponed its visit to Russia last minute because the mission was "technically not ready". According to a participant during a meeting of EU finance ministers in Budapest where a "heated discussion" with Georgieva occurred, she defended her decision to let the staff mission go ahead.

== Other activities ==
=== European Union institutions ===
- European Investment Bank (EIB), member of the Appointment Advisory Committee (since 2017)

=== Non-profit organizations ===
- World Economic Forum (WEF), Member of the Board of Trustees (since 2020)
- Co-chair of World Economic Forum High-Level Group on Humanitarian Investing
- Global Commission on Adaptation, co-chair (since 2018)
- Generation Unlimited, member of the board (since 2018)
- Paris Peace Forum, member of the steering committee (since 2018)
- European Council on Foreign Relations (ECFR), member of the council
- University of National and World Economy, member of the board of trustees
- Women Political Leaders Global Forum (WPL), member of the global advisory board
- China Council for International Cooperation on Environment and Development (CCICED), honorary member (2012)
- Institute for Sustainable Communities, member of the board of trustees (2003–2005)
- LEAD International, member of the board of trustees (2003–2009)

== Recognition ==
- In 2010, she was named "European of the Year" and "Commissioner of the Year" by European Voice in recognition for her leadership in the EU's response to humanitarian crises.
- In 2014, she received the Central European University Open Society Prize.
- In 2016, Georgieva was honored with the Devex Power with Purpose award for her work in global development.
- In 2017, Georgieva was listed by UK-based company Richtopia at number 2 in the list of 100 Most Influential People in Multinational Organisations.
- She has been awarded the Princess Marina Sturdza award, and the Foreign Policy Association Medal.
- In October 2020, she received the Atlantic Council's Distinguished International Leadership Award in acknowledgement of exceptional and distinctive contributions during her career of public service.
- In 2020, Georgieva was named on Time's list of the 100 most influential people in the world.
- In 2022, Kristalina was awarded by Forbes as one of the 50 over 50 women leading the way throughout Europe, the Middle East and Africa.
- She has received honorary degrees from American University in Bulgaria and the University of National and World Economy in Sofia.
- In 2024, She received the Ugo La Malfa Award for her contribution to international cooperation

== Personal life ==
Georgieva is married to Kino Kinov. They have one daughter and two grandchildren.

Political offices
Preceded by Meglena Kuneva	Bulgarian European Commissioner; 2010–2017	Succeeded by Mariya Gabriel; Nominee
Preceded by Karel De Gucht as European Commissioner for Development and Humanitarian Aid	European Commissioner for International Cooperation, Humanitarian Aid and Crisis Response; 2010–2014	Succeeded by Neven Mimica as European Commissioner for International Cooperation and Development
Preceded by Karel De Gucht as European Commissioner for Development and Humanitarian Aid	European Commissioner for International Cooperation, Humanitarian Aid and Crisis Response; 2010–2014	Succeeded by Christos Stylianides as European Commissioner for Humanitarian Aid and Crisis Management
Preceded by Jacek Dominik as European Commissioner for Financial Programming and the Budget	European Commissioner for the Budget and Human Resources; 2014–2017	Succeeded by Günther Oettinger
Diplomatic posts
Preceded by Jim Yong Kim	President of the World Bank Group; Acting; 2019	Succeeded by David Malpass
Preceded by David Lipton; Acting	Managing Director of the International Monetary Fund; 2019–present	Incumbent
