= Novomatic =

Austrian gambling company

Coordinates: 48.0364°N 16.2943°E

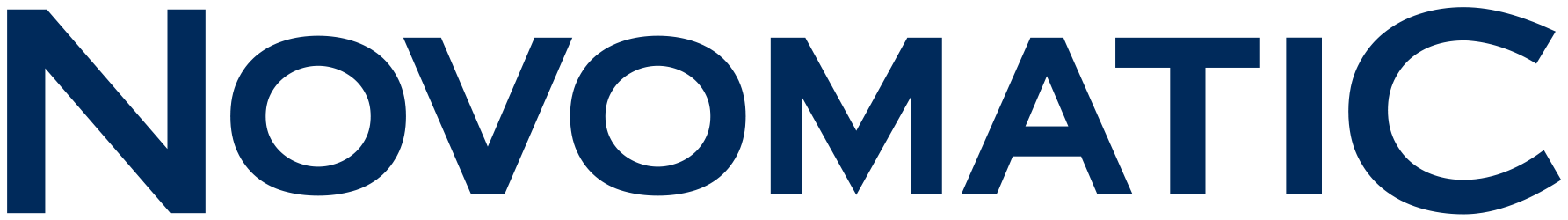
- Company logo

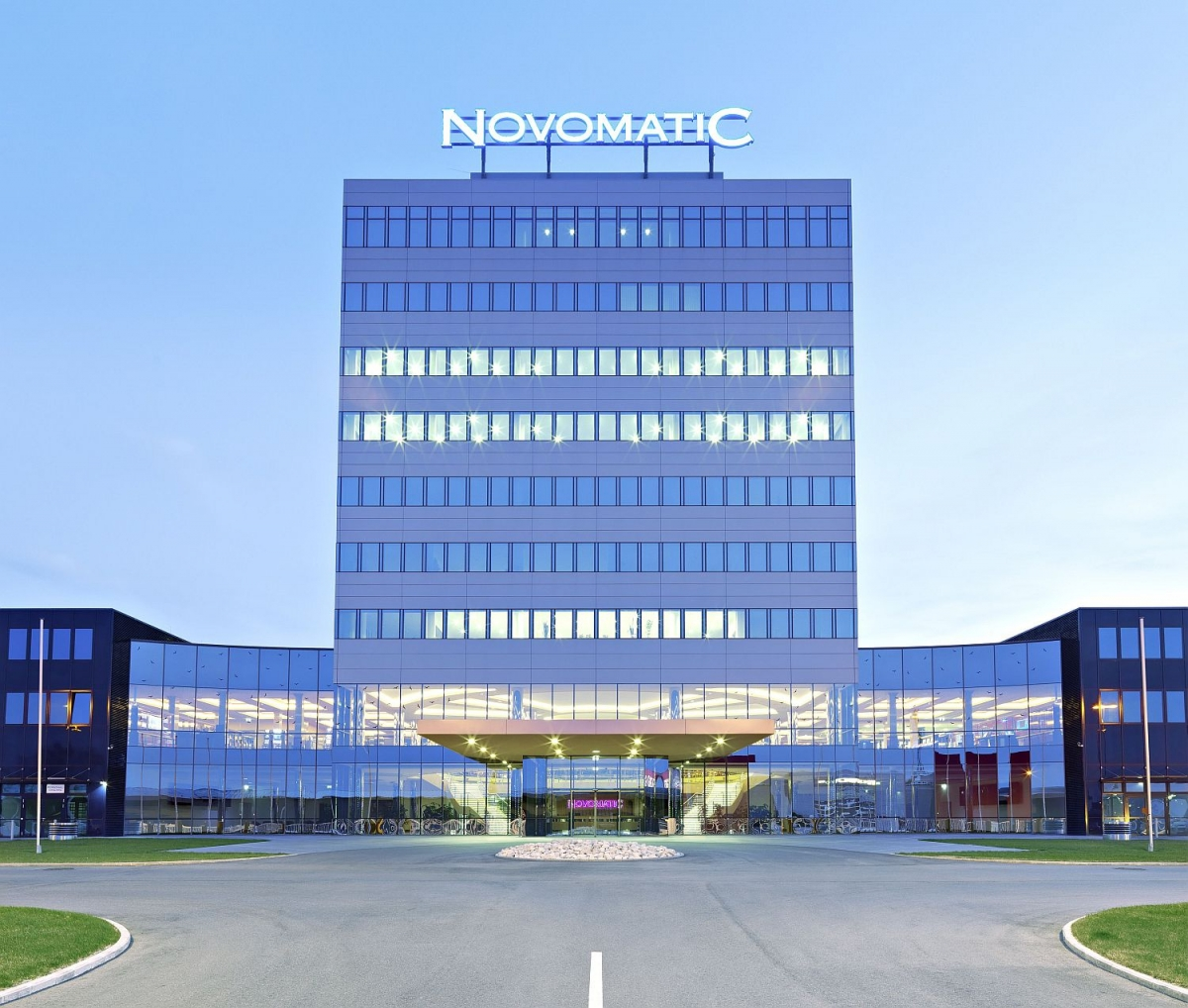
- Novomatic head office
- Industry: Gambling
- Founded: 1980
- Headquarters: Gumpoldskirchen, Lower Austria, Austria
- Number of locations: 43 countries
- Key people: Johann Graf (founder & owner)
- Revenue: €1.84 billion (2021)
- Operating income: €588 million (2021)
- Total assets: €3.94 billion (2021)
- Number of employees: 21,173 (2021)
- Website: novomatic.com

Novomatic is an international gambling company based in Austria, founded by Johann Graf in 1980.

Novomatic operates about 2,000 casinos and other gaming facilities in about 50 countries, many of them under the Admiral Casino brand. It also offers online gambling, and produces slot machines and other technology for the gaming industry. As of 2021, it has about 21,000 employees and annual revenue of €1.8 billion.

== History ==
Johann Graf initially partnered with Gerhard Brodnik in the 1970s to start Brodnik & Graf, a company that was importing pinball machines from Belgium. In 1980, Brodnik decided to quit, and Graf oriented towards producing gambling machines under the Admiral brand. A number of Admiral branded casinos were opened. (Note: For example, the Austrian Russian Joint Venture JV Neva Chance was a St. Petersburg casino registered in May 1992 and established in 1993. Its co-owners were Novomatic with nearly all its shares and "Neva-Chance" (AOZT "Casino") which had the same address as Vladimir Putin's Committee for External Relations and according to law was supposed to own a share in every St Petersburg casino. The telephone number for "Neva-Chance", JV Casino Neva, and Putin's Committee for External Relations was exactly the same, too. Neva Chance changed its name several times eventually becoming in 1997 the Admiral-Club, however its taxpayer identification number and its registration location at Antonenko Street, 6, had never changed. Through the Swedish Russian Joint Venture JV Petrodin, proceeds from this casino or chorny mal, which Viktor Zolotov acquired for Vladimir Putin, were used as capital to establish Bank Rossiya. Several prestigiously located casinos around St Petersburg are called Admiral.) Novomatic expanded globally during the decade and vastly improved the technology. It was among the first gambling equipment manufacturers to use touch screen technology.

In 2010, Novomatic expanded into online gambling business by acquiring controlling stake in London based Greentube studio. Greentube, in addition to their original content, is the main online publisher of already established Novomatic slot games. Greentube then purchased Canadian based Bluebat Games studio in 2015 to further expand its online presence.

Instant win and digital scratchcard provider, Gamevy, formed a partnership with Novomatic subsidiary, Novomatic Lottery Solutions (NLS), in November 2016. The tie-up presents NLS with an opportunity to focus on "the broader lottery demographic".

In 2018 Novomatic completed the purchase of 52% of Australian gambling equipment maker Ainsworth Game Technology Limited for around 300 million Euros. That was Novomatic's largest acquisition since the acquisition of Greentube in 2010.

In November 2022, it was announced Novomatic had acquired the Italian gambling business, HBG Group.

== Gaming operations ==
Novomatic operates about 2,000 gaming facilities, including casinos, slot parlors, betting shops, and bingo halls. It also offers online gambling directly to consumers.

This segment accounts for 56% of the company's revenues as of 2021, with the bulk of the business coming from Austria, Germany, Italy, the United Kingdom, and Eastern Europe.

=== Germany ===
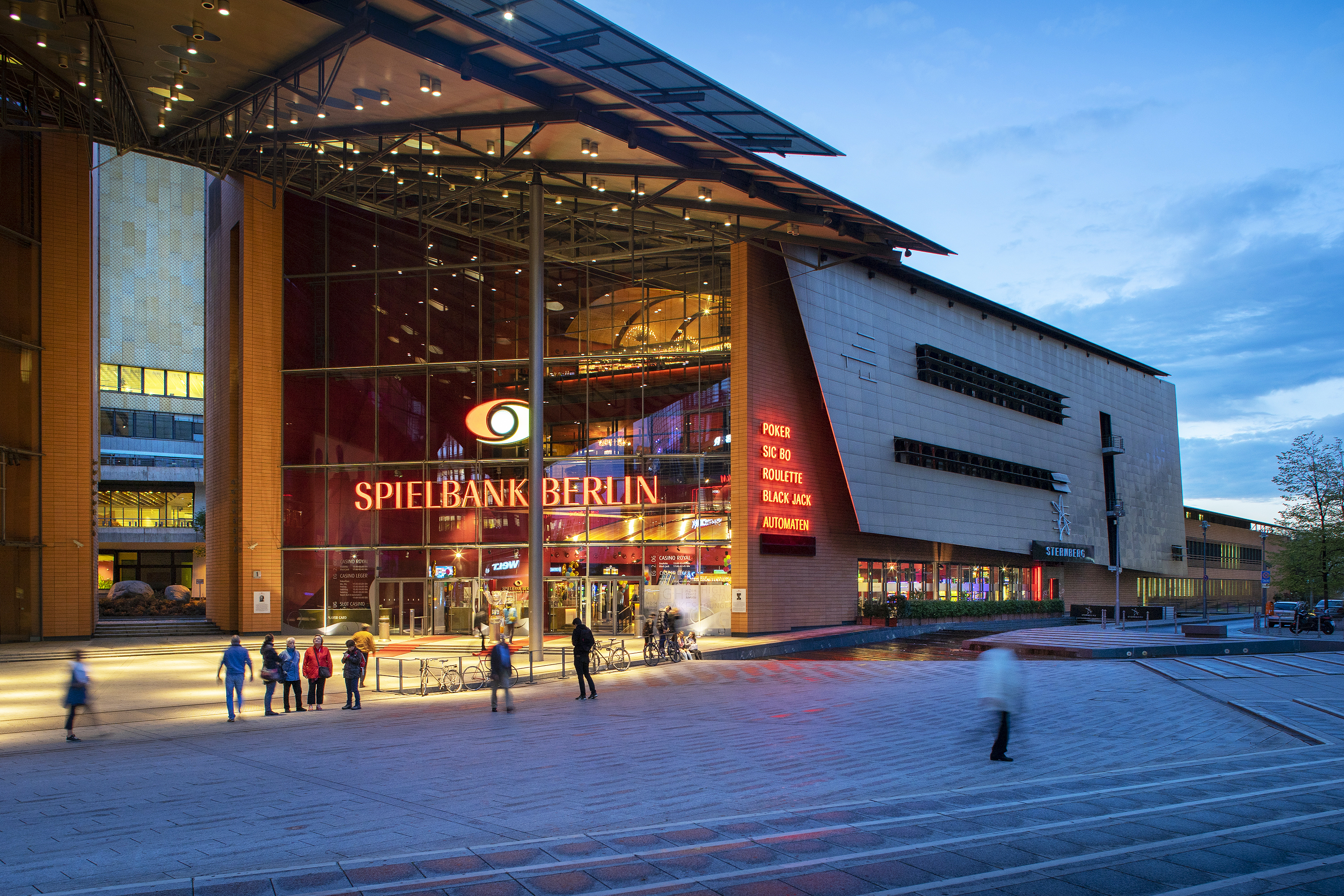
Spielbank Berlin casino at Potsdamer Platz

Novomatic subsidiary Löwen Entertainment operates about 520 Admiral Spielhalle slot arcades around Germany. Novomatic also operates casinos in Germany, including the Spielbank Berlin.

=== United Kingdom ===
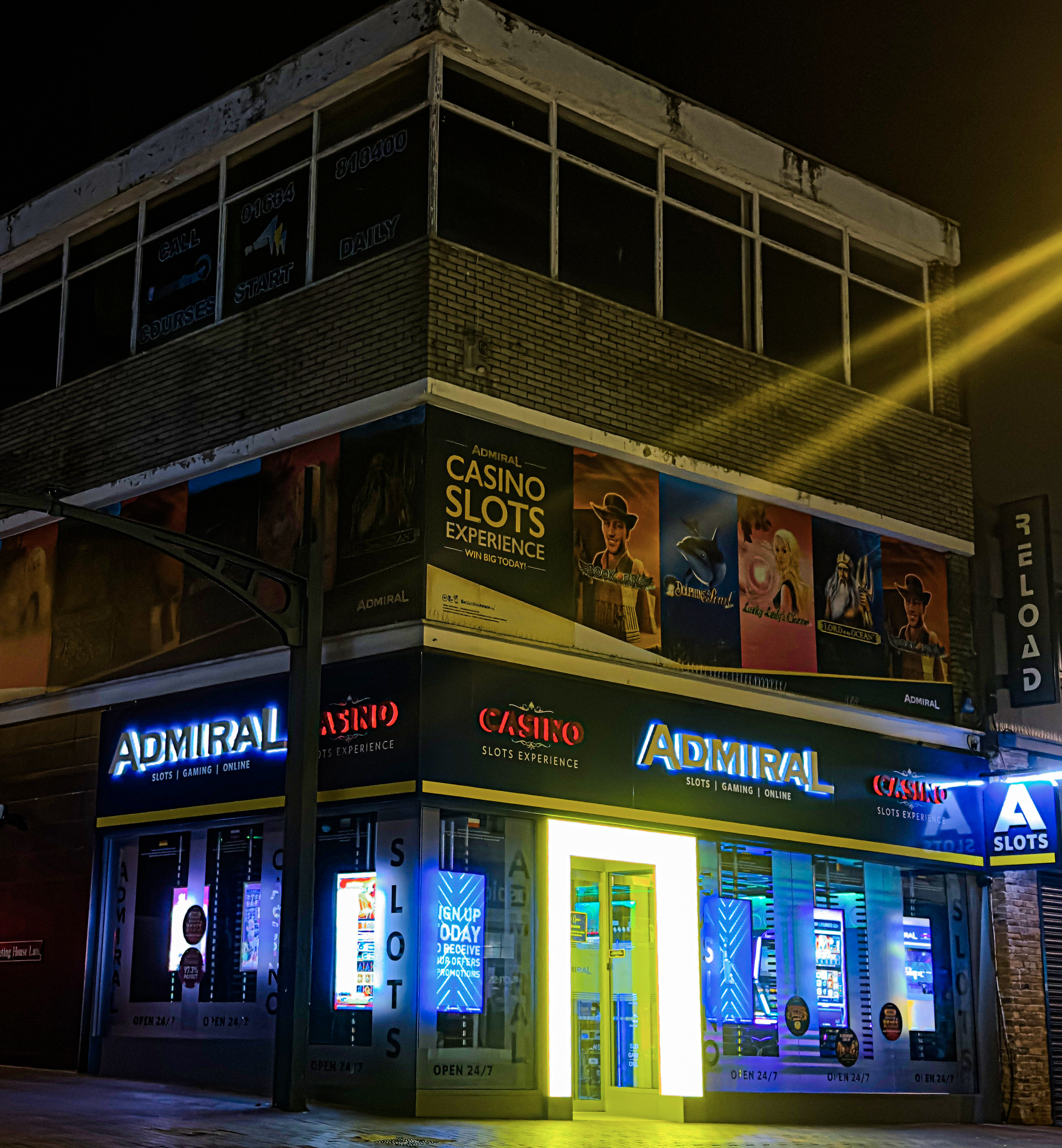
Admiral Casino, High Street, Chatham, Kent, England

Novomatic operates Admiral Casino in the United Kingdom, a brand that includes a licensed online casino, as well as a chain of more than 270 gambling venues in the UK operated by Luxury Leisure. Its online casino includes slots, jackpot games, roulette, blackjack, table games, and live casino. Luxury Leisure is owned by Greentube Alderney Limited, part of the Greentube group, which in turn is owned by Novomatic.

In 2014, Novomatic acquired Luxury Leisure, which operated seaside amusement arcades and other venues. In June 2016, Novomatic bought the UK gambling company Talarius, which operated the Quicksilver high street gambling outlets, from the Tatts Group. These retail gambling arcades were combined and rebranded as "Admiral".

In 2018, Greentube Alderney launched the Admiral-branded online casino, AdmiralCasino.co.uk.

Admiral Casino is licensed to operate a remote gaming business in the United Kingdom from the UK Gambling Commission. Admiral Casino is licensed and regulated by the Alderney Gambling Control Commission (AGCC) (GCB).

=== France ===
In July 2025, Novomatic acquired the 11 French casinos that were owned by Vikings Casinos, a subsidiary of Groupe Vikings, a French company based in Falaise, Normandy (France). This gives Novomatic a strong presence in France.

== Controversies ==
- The Novomatic subsidiary G. Matica had not installed the accounting system for the mandatory networking of machines with the Italian tax authorities and was sentenced in 2012 to a fine of 150 million euros. Novomatic considered the claim as "completely unjustified" and appealed against the first instance decision. In June 2014, Novomatic paid a settlement amount of €47.5 million.
- In 2009, the Polish government under Prime Minister Donald Tusk planned an increase in gambling levies to finance the budget for European Football Championship 2012 (co-organized with Ukraine). As a result, among other things, lobbyists of the gambling operators exerted influence on the Polish government members against this tax increase. The Rzeczpospolita daily newspaper published tape recordings of the Anti-Corruption Authority CBA, resulting in the "Black Jack Gate" scandal, which caused several Polish ministers to resign; namely Interior Minister Grzegorz Schetyna, Minister of Justice Andrzej Czuma and the Vice-Minister of Economy Andrzej Szejnfeld. The current government in Poland re-opened the gambling case.
- According to an ORF report of October 2015, the Romanian National Anticorruption Directorate is investigating a joint venture with the state-owned Loteria Română.
- In December 2021 Greentube Alderney was fined £685,000 by the UK Gambling Commission following an investigation that uncovered money laundering and social responsibility failures.
- On February 27, the Austrian prosecution office WKStA announced that a criminal complaint had now been sent to the accused persons in regard to the Ibiza Affair. Austrian daily KURIER confirmed that the indictment is against HC Strache, Johann Graf, Harald Neumann, and Novomatic as an association.
