= Johann Graf =

Austrian billionaire and businessman

- Born: 3 January 1946 (age 80)
- Occupation: Businessman
- Title: Founder and owner, Novomatic
- Children: 3

Johann Graf (born 3 January 1946) is an Austrian billionaire businessman, the founder and owner of Novomatic, an Austrian gambling company.

== Early life ==
Graf was born in Austria on January 3, 1946. He grew up with his grandparents in Vienna-Döbling. He completed an apprenticeship as a butcher and was Austria's youngest master butcher at the age of 23. However, Graf did not want to continue his parents' business, a butcher's shop with a pub and a few guest rooms in Perchtoldsdorf.

== Career ==
In 1974, Graf founded Brodnik & Graf GmbH with the electrical retailer Gerhard Brodnik and started importing Belgian pinball machines, which were installed in pubs and cafes. In 1980, he started manufacturing gaming machines and founded Novomatic Automatenhandels GmbH with a starting capital of 50,000 schillings.

His first success came in 1982, when he founded a sales company in Switzerland and soon dominated 70% of the Swiss market. By 1990, Novomatic had branches in more than 50 countries. As a result, the company grew to become one of the largest integrated gaming groups in the world with around 30,000 employees in 2021.

On January 28, 2021, it was announced that Graf had given away 20% of the shares in Novomatic's holding company, Novo Invest GmbH (which itself holds 90% of Novomatic), 10% to his son Thomas Graf, who is Chief Technology Officer of Novomatic AG, and 5% each to managing directors of Novo Invest, Birgit Wimmer and Ryszard Presch (CEO of Novomatic AG). Graf himself spoke of a generational change.

In February 2026, the Austrian daily Kurier reported that the Austrian Public Prosecutor’s Office for Economic Crimes and Corruption (WKStA) intends to file criminal charges in the so-called Ibiza affair on suspicion of accepting and granting undue advantages in connection with the 2019 appointment of former FPÖ politician Peter Sidlo as Chief Financial Officer of Casinos Austria AG against Heinz-Christian Strache, Harald Neumann, Johann F. Graf, and the Novomatic AG as a corporate entity, after an earlier plan to discontinue the proceedings was reconsidered following instructions from the Ministry of Justice.

== Wealth ==
Alongside Dietrich Mateschitz and Karl Wlaschek, Graf is considered one of Austria's most successful self-made billionaires. In 2012, he was the richest man in Austria together with Dietrich Mateschitz, with a net worth of US$5.3 billion. In 2015, he was the second richest Austrian with a fortune of $6.6 billion and ranked 208th on the Forbes list. In the 2024 Forbes ranking he was the third richest Austrian, with an estimated net worth of $7.1 billion.

== Personal life ==
Graf is divorced with three children and lives in Vienna. He collects vintage cars and owns some 120, most of which are Jaguars. He is known to avoid the public eye.

== Awards ==
- Appointment as Kommerzialrat
- Senator of the UNESCO
- 2003: Awarded the title of Professor by the President of the Republic of Austria
- 2008: Trend "Man of the Year"
