= Janusz Lewandowski =

Polish politician and economist (born 1951)

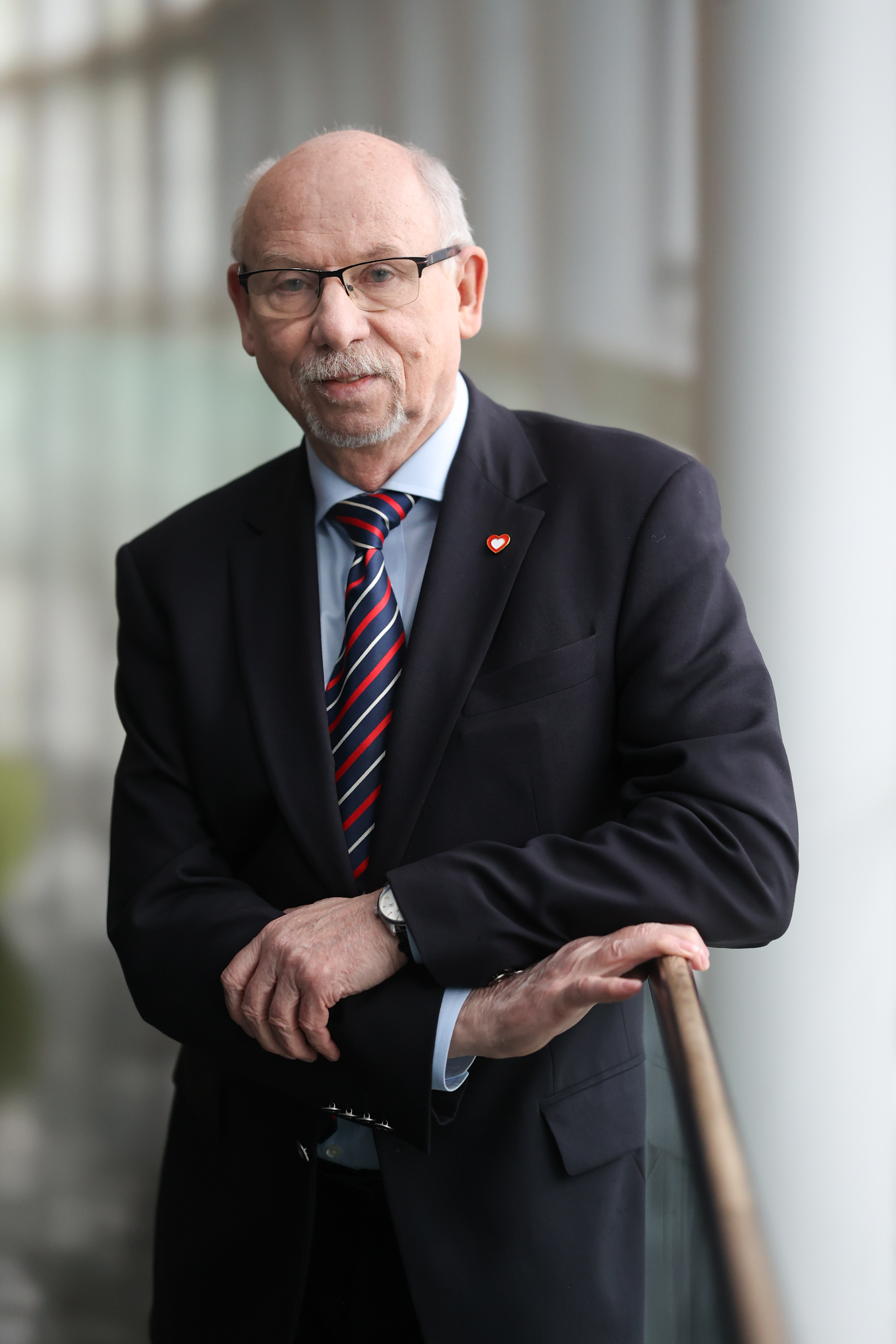

European Commissioner for Financial Programming and the Budget
- In office 9 February 2010 – 1 July 2014
- President: José Manuel Barroso
- Preceded by: Algirdas Šemeta
- Succeeded by: Andris Piebalgs (Acting)

Member of the European Parliament for Poland
- Incumbent
- Assumed office 1 July 2014

Minister of Privatisation
- In office 12 January 1991 – 23 December 1991
- In office 11 July 1992 – 26 October 1993

Member of Sejm
- In office 25 November 1991 – 14 October 1993
- In office 20 October 1997 – 13 June 2004

Personal details
- Born: Janusz Antoni Lewandowski; 13 June 1951 (age 75) Lublin, Poland
- Party: Solidarity (1980–1988); Liberal Democratic Congress (1988–1994); Freedom Union (1994–2001); Civic Platform (2001–present)
- Education: University of Gdańsk

Janusz Antoni Lewandowski (Polish pronunciation: [ˈjanuʂ lɛvanˈdɔfskʲi]; born 13 June 1951) is a Polish politician and economist belonging to the Gdańsk liberals group, and a former member of the European Parliament (elected on 13 June 2004), Chairman of the Committee on Budgets. On 27 November 2009, he obtained the post of Budget and Financial Programming Commissioner of the European Commission and is affiliated to the European People's Party (EPP). He was re-elected for the 8th term (2014–2019) of the European Parliament, as a member of the EPP group.

== Biography ==
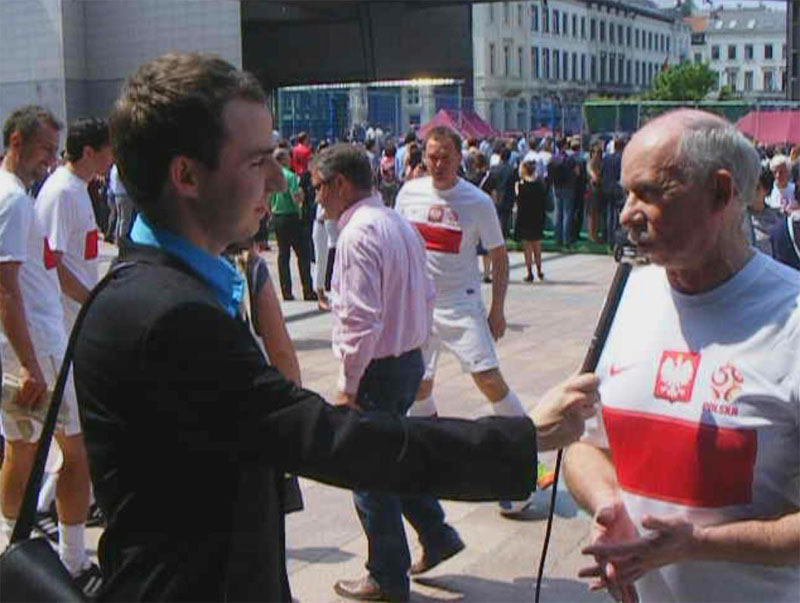
Paweł Rogaliński and Janusz Lewandowski (2012)

Lewandowski was born in Lublin. He graduated in economics from University of Gdańsk, received a doctorate and was a lecturer there until 1984. Later he worked for Polish Oceanic Lines (Polskie Linie Oceaniczne). He was also a lecturer at Harvard University and the founder of the Research Institute for Market Economy in Gdańsk (Instytut Badań nad Gospodarką Rynkową w Gdańsku). He is an author of a book on famous liberals and he also writes short articles for several newspapers and magazines, including Rzeczpospolita, Gazeta Wyborcza, Parkiet, Polityka, Wprost and Newsweek.

== Political career ==
From 1980 to 1989 he was an economics adviser to the Solidarity anti-communist movement, and in 1988 he was one of the founders of the Liberal Democratic Congress. He was the Minister of Privatization in the cabinets of Jan Krzysztof Bielecki (1990–1991) and Hanna Suchocka (1992–1993). His major successes were the foundation of the Warsaw Stock Exchange and the mass privatization programme (Program Powszechnej Prywatyzacji).

He lost his parliamentary seat in the 1993 elections and worked as an international expert from 1994 to 1997. After the merger of KLD and Democratic Union in 1994 he became a member of Freedom Union (UW), and in 1997 member of Sejm representing UW. Together with Donald Tusk and other liberals he seceded from UW to form Civic Platform, and was elected an MP again in 2001. Since 2003 he was an observer in the European Parliament.

In the 2004 European Parliament election he was a candidate of Civic Platform in constituency #1 Pomeranian Voivodship and received 79,879 votes (=20.17%, the best result in the region). On 23 July 2004 he was elected chair of the Parliamentary Committee on Budgets. Andris Piebalgs was twice Acting Commissioner in his stead, from 19 April 2014 – 25 May 2014 while he was on electoral campaign leave for the 2014 European Parliament election from 1 July 2014 – 16 July 2014 after he took up his seat.

Lewandowski was re-elected for the 8th term (2014–2019) of the European Parliament, as a member of the EPP group. He was re-elected for the 9th term (2019–2024) of the European Parliament and was chosen as the 1st Vice-Chair of the EP Committee on Budgets.

== Political positions ==
Lewandowski has expressed skepticism about the scientific consensus on anthropogenic climate change, putting him at odds with many of his colleagues in the Barroso Commission. MEPs have asked "which steps" president Barroso will take over the comments. As one of the key experts on the European Union long term budget, known as "Multiannual Financial Framework", or MFF, MEP Lewandowski was one of the European Parliament "rapporteurs", recommending the agreement on the MFF 2021–2027.

== See also ==
- 2004 European Parliament election in Poland

Political offices
Preceded by Paweł Samecki	Polish European Commissioner; 2010–2014	Succeeded by Jacek Dominik
Preceded by Algirdas Šemeta	European Commissioner for Financial Programming and the Budget; 2010–2014	Succeeded by Andris Piebalgs; Acting
