= European Commissioner for Budget, Anti-Fraud and Public Administration =

Member of the EU Commission

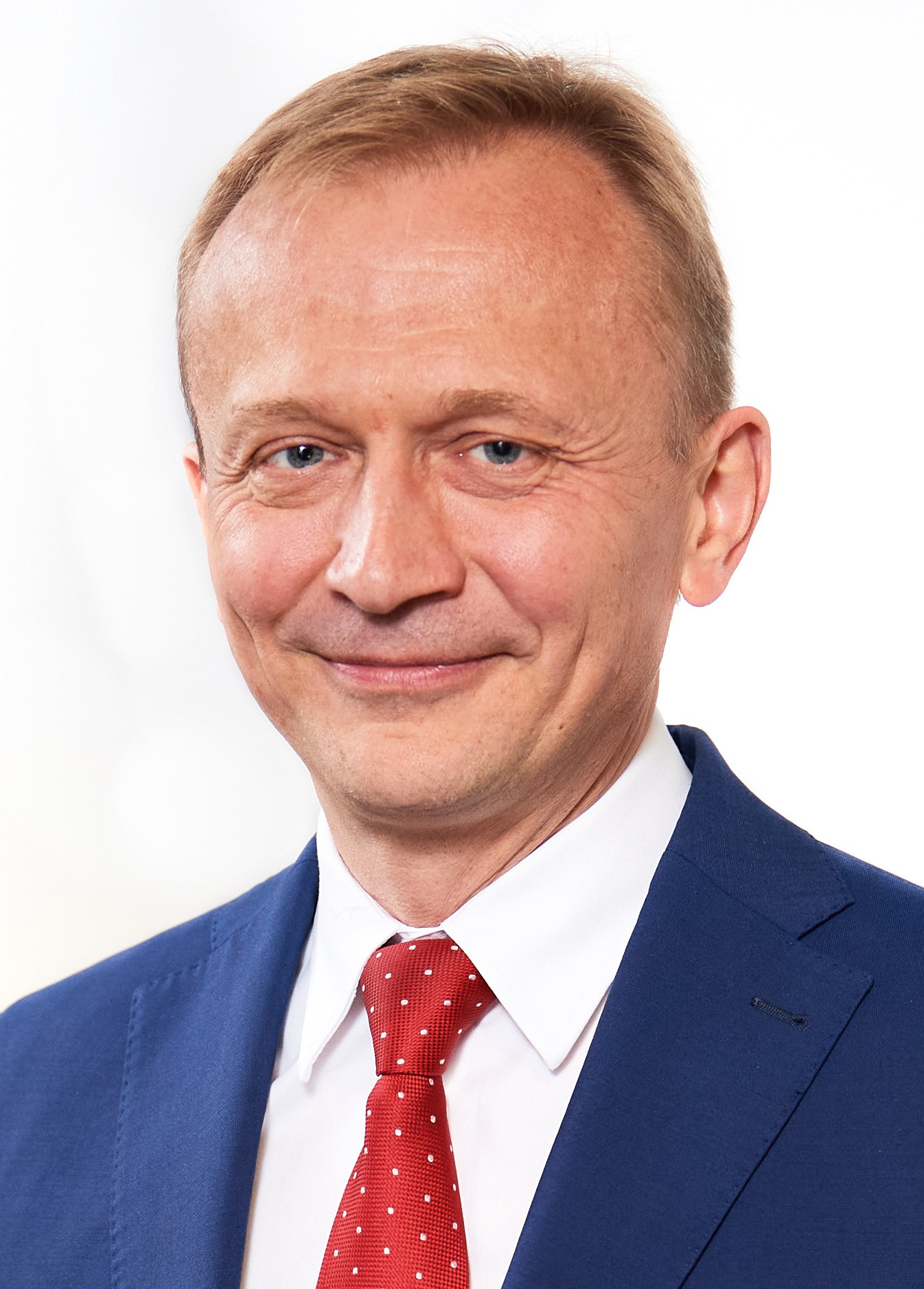
- Incumbent; Piotr Serafin since 1 December 2024
- Style: Mr. Commissioner
- Member of: the European Commission
- Reports to: President of the European Commission
- Term length: 5 years
- Formation: 2 July 1967; 59 years ago
- First holder: Albert Coppé

The European Commissioner for Budget, Anti-Fraud and Public Administration is the member of the European Commission who is responsible for negotiating and managing the EU budget. The current commissioner is Piotr Serafin.

The portfolio is primarily responsible for the management of the budget of the European Union and related financial issues except for budgetary discharge which falls under the Admin Commissioner.

== The Commissioners ==
Janusz Lewandowski was the European Commissioner for Financial Programming and the Budget as part of the Barroso Commission II. His predecessor was Algirdas Šemeta, who in turn succeeded fellow Lithuanian Dalia Grybauskaitė. The European Parliament approved a Commissioner for Financial Programming & the Budget for the first time in 2004, a position expanded since the Prodi Commission to include Financial Programming.

The Commissioner's 121.6 billion euro 2008 budget proposed that for the first time, the budget towards sustainable growth (€57.2 billion) would be higher than that of the Common Agricultural Policy (€56.3 billion), traditionally the largest source of expenditure in the EU. There would be an increase in cohesion funds, energy and transport of 14%, research by 11% and lifelong learning by 9%. There would also be an increase in the administrative budget, aid to Kosovo and Palestinian institutions and funds towards the Galileo project.

== List of commissioners ==
#	Name	Country	Period	Commission
1	Albert Coppé	Belgium	1967–1973	Malfatti Commission, Mansholt Commission
2	Wilhelm Haferkamp	Germany	1973–1977	Ortoli Commission
3	Christopher Tugendhat	United Kingdom	1977–1985	Jenkins Commission, Thorn Commission
4	Henning Christophersen	Denmark	1985–1989	Delors Commission I
5	Peter Schmidhuber	Germany	1989–1995	Delors Commission II & III
6	Erkki Liikanen	Finland	1995–1999	Santer Commission
7	Michaele Schreyer	Germany	1999–2004	Prodi Commission
8	Markos Kyprianou	Cyprus	2004	Prodi Commission
9	Dalia Grybauskaitė	Lithuania	2004–2009	Barroso Commission I
10	Algirdas Šemeta	Lithuania	2009–2010	Barroso Commission I
11	Janusz Lewandowski	Poland	2010–2014	Barroso Commission II
12	Jacek Dominik	Poland	2014–2014	Barroso Commission II
13	Kristalina Georgieva	Bulgaria	2014–2016	Juncker Commission
14	Günther Oettinger	Germany	2017–2019	Juncker Commission
15	Johannes Hahn	Austria	2019–2024	Von der Leyen Commission I
16	Piotr Serafin	Poland	2024–present	Von der Leyen Commission II

== See also ==
- Directorate-General for Budget
- European Union Budget
