= Algirdas Šemeta =

Lithuanian economist and politician

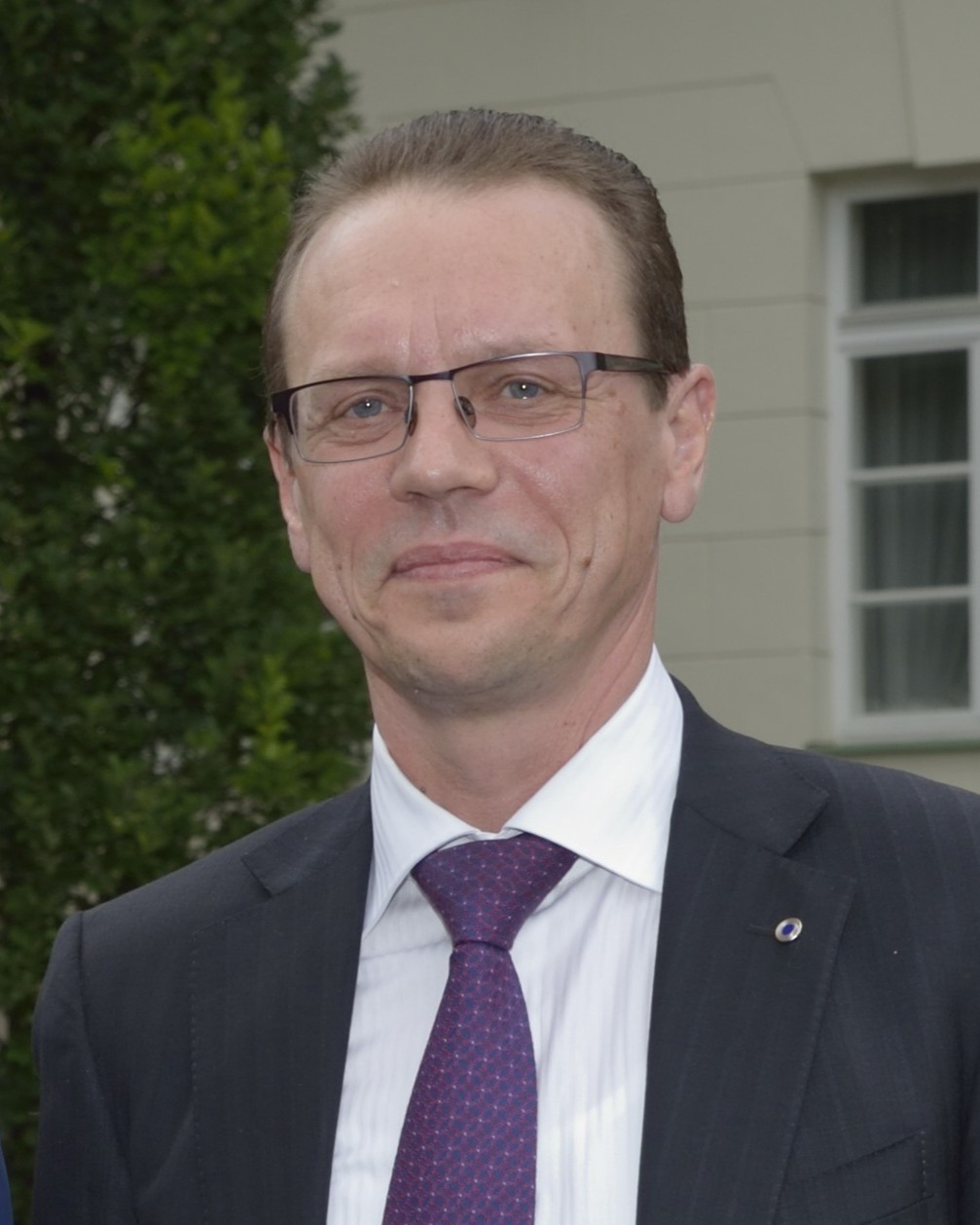
- Šemeta in 2013

European Commissioner for Taxation and Customs Union, Audit and Anti-Fraud
- In office 9 February 2010 – 1 November 2014
- President: José Manuel Barroso
- Preceded by: László Kovács (Taxation and Customs Union); Siim Kallas (Administrative Affairs, Audit and Anti-Fraud)
- Succeeded by: Pierre Moscovici ( Economic and Financial Affairs, Taxation and Customs)

European Commissioner for Financial Programming and the Budget
- In office 1 July 2009 – 9 February 2010
- President: José Manuel Barroso
- Preceded by: Dalia Grybauskaitė
- Succeeded by: Janusz Lewandowski

Personal details
- Born: 23 April 1962 (age 64) Vilnius, Lithuanian SSR, Soviet Union (now Lithuania)
- Party: Homeland Union
- Education: Vilnius University
- Algirdas Šemeta's voice Šemeta on an agreement with British American Tobacco to reduce cigarette smuggling in the European Union; Recorded 15 July 2010

Algirdas Gediminas Šemeta (born 23 April 1962) is a Lithuanian economist and politician.

== Biography ==
A native of Vilnius, Algirdas Šemeta graduated in 1985 from Vilnius University's Faculty of Economic Cybernetics and Finance with a degree as economist-mathematician. His previous position has been as Lithuania's Minister of Finance, which he fulfilled from December 2008 to June 2009, having already served in the post a decade earlier, from February 1997 to June 1999. Šemeta has minimal business experience in the private sector, his career to date has been concentrated in public office as a civil servant.

He was European Commissioner for Taxation and Customs Union, Audit and Anti-Fraud from July 2009 till November 2014. Following his Commission nomination by center-right Prime Minister Andrius Kubilius, Šemeta has affiliated himself with the European People's Party (EPP). Since December 2014 Šemeta is Business Ombudsman in Ukraine.

Political offices
Preceded by Dalia Grybauskaitė	Lithuanian European Commissioner; 2009–2014	Succeeded by Vytenis Andriukaitis
Preceded by Dalia Grybauskaitė	European Commissioner for Financial Programming and the Budget; 2009–2010	Succeeded by Janusz Lewandowski
Preceded by László Kovács as European Commissioner for Taxation and Customs Union	European Commissioner for Taxation and Customs Union, Audit and Anti-Fraud; 2010–2014	Succeeded by Pierre Moscovici as European Commissioner for Economic and Financial Affairs, Taxation and Customs
Preceded by Siim Kallas as European Commissioner for Administrative Affairs, Audit and Anti-Fraud	European Commissioner for Taxation and Customs Union, Audit and Anti-Fraud; 2010–2014	Succeeded by Pierre Moscovici as European Commissioner for Economic and Financial Affairs, Taxation and Customs
