= List of ambassadors of the Czech Republic to the United States =

Coordinates: 38.939282°N 77.054137°W

Ambassador of Czech Republic to the United States Embassy of the Czech Republic in Washington, D.C.
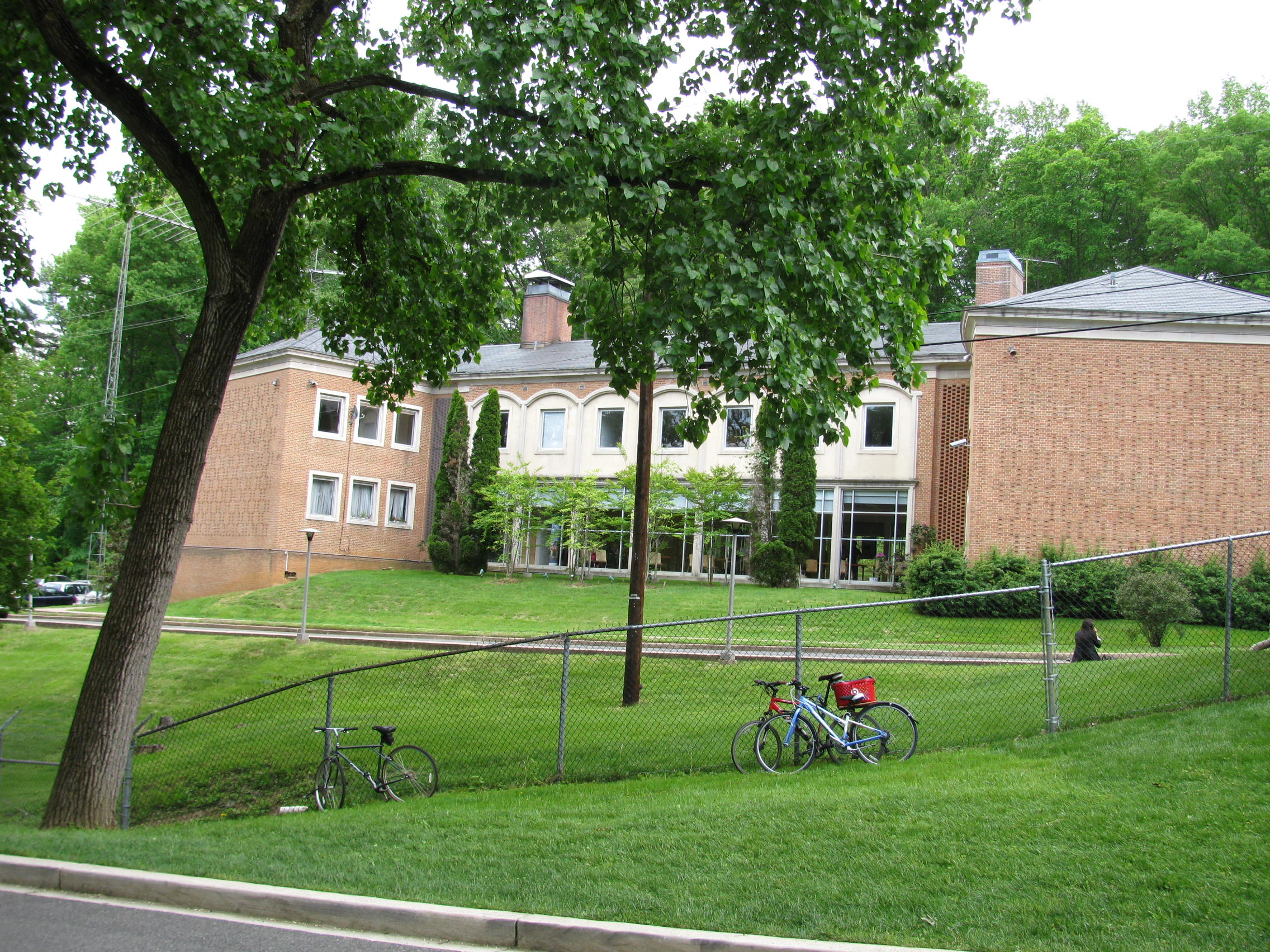
- Incumbent; Miloslav Stašek since September 2, 2022
- Inaugural holder: Charles Pergler
- Formation: 1918

The Czech ambassador in Washington, D. C. is the official representative of the Government in Prague to the Government of the United States.

== List of representatives ==
Diplomatic agrément	Diplomatic accreditation	Ambassador	Notes	President of the Czech Republic	President of the United States	Term end
1918		Charles Pergler		Tomáš Garrigue Masaryk	Woodrow Wilson	
December 8, 1919			Legation Opened	Tomáš Garrigue Masaryk	Woodrow Wilson	
December 8, 1919		Jan Masaryk	Charge d'Affaires	Tomáš Garrigue Masaryk	Woodrow Wilson	
October 5, 1920		Karel Halla	Charge d'Affaires (1876–1939)	Tomáš Garrigue Masaryk	Woodrow Wilson	
January 5, 1921		Bedřich Štěpánek	(Note: Bedřich Štěpánek (1884–1953), a lawyer and diplomat who received his training in Vienna, Paris and Moscow. When the Czechoslovak Republic was established in 1918, he helped with laying the foundation.)	Tomáš Garrigue Masaryk	Warren G. Harding	
June 15, 1923		František Chvalkovský		Tomáš Garrigue Masaryk	Calvin Coolidge	
October 12, 1925		Zdeněk Fierlinger		Tomáš Garrigue Masaryk	Calvin Coolidge	
November 5, 1928	November 20, 1928	Ferdinand Veverka	(Note: Ferdinand Veverka (b. 1887), his wife Nelly was the daughter of Julius Gregr)	Tomáš Garrigue Masaryk	Calvin Coolidge	
December 30, 1936		Vladimír Ladislav Dionýz Svetozárov Hurban	(Note: Vladimír Ladislav Dionýz Svetozárov Hurban (1883-1949), son of diplomat Svetozár Hurban-Vajanský. From 1918 to 1921 he was head of Czech military mission in Washington, D. C.)	Edvard Beneš	Franklin D. Roosevelt	
June 28, 1943			Legation raised to Embassy	Emil Hácha	Franklin D. Roosevelt	
June 14, 1943	June 28, 1943	Vladimír Ladislav Dionýz Svetozárov Hurban	(Note: Vladimír Ladislav Dionýz Svetozárov Hurban (1883-1949), Slovak military man and Czechoslovak diplomat; he served as Chargé d'affaires in Egypt from 1924 to 1930, Envoy in Stockholm to Sweden, Norway and Lithuania from 1930 to 1937, and Envoy in the US and Cuba from 1939 to 1946.)	Emil Hácha	Franklin D. Roosevelt	
June 4, 1946	June 12, 1946	Juraj Slávik	Juraj Slávik, broadcast 15 June 1942 (originally planned for 11 June 1942). One source even suggests that the speech was originally planned for 1 June 1942. The assassination of Heydrich took place on 27 May	Edvard Beneš	Harry S. Truman	
March 3, 1948		Vladimír Outrata	(19. 4. 1909 Caslav - 9. 7. 1970 Prague)	Klement Gottwald	Harry S. Truman	
June 14, 1948	June 21, 1948	Vladimír Procházka		Klement Gottwald	Harry S. Truman	
August 23, 1951	August 28, 1951	Karel Petrželka	Czechoslovak Diplomat: (* April 2, 1907, Brno) educated at Univ. of Brno Law School, LL.D. 1932. Engaged in practice of law, 1932–33	Klement Gottwald	Harry S. Truman	
October 13, 1952	October 24, 1952	Miroslav Růžek		Klement Gottwald	Harry S. Truman	
May 5, 1959	May 20, 1959	Karel Duda	1992 ambassador London	Antonín Novotný	Dwight D. Eisenhower	
October 1, 1963	November 13, 1963	Ivan Roháľ-Iľkiv	(* February 16, 1917) In 1963 he was Ambassador in New Delhi.	Antonín Novotný	Lyndon B. Johnson	
October 15, 1969	October 16, 1969	Dušan Spáčil	(* May 17, 1929 in Brno) Took part in anti-German resistance, once in June 1945 joined the Communist Party. After graduating from secondary school, he studied from r. 1948 first law at Charles University, and later in Kiev and Moscow State University (JUDr. 1954). From August 1954 until his retirement beginning. R. 1990 worked in Czechoslovakia. Communist diplomacy. His career began in the years 1956–1960 as III. Secretary of the Permanent Mission of Czechoslovakia to the United Nations in New York, then he worked in the Ministry of Foreign Affairs and OMO in l. 1962 to 1964 then as First Secretary at the Embassy in Vienna, where he worked as the issue IAEA. From September 1964 to September 1967 he was the first secretary and later CS series. Embassy in Moscow after returning to Prague was again included in the OMO, which belonged even during the Prague Spring to the defenders of the "old order" r. 1969 also belonged to the ministry of the founders SČSP. After the onset Minister Mark J. (see) became a member of its narrower cabinet in 1970–71, then he drove OMO. From November 1971 to April 1975 he served as Ambassador to the US, after returning to Prague in May 1975 became one of five deputy ministers B. Chnoupek (see), and remained so until March 1983. His competency initially belonged MIT, and ADO IIR, and later territorial departments in the report were sessions with countries 'capitalist' Europe, after the retirement of F. Krajčír l. 1979-1983 conversely led divisions dedicated to relations with the USSR and the socialist states (1 and 2 TOs) . *From April 1983 to the end of 1988 he was the ambassador in Bonn (Germany) After appeals to Prague, then was appointed last communist Director of IIR, which remained until February 1990. In February 1990, he retired. The author strongly apologetic memoirs: We of Czernin (1996).	Ludvík Svoboda	Richard Nixon	
September 30, 1971		Jaroslav Zantovsky	Charge d'Affaires (* July 2, 1924 in Brandýs n. Labem – December 15, 1986 in Prague).	Ludvík Svoboda	Richard Nixon	
March 7, 1972	March 27, 1972	Dušan Spáčil		Ludvík Svoboda	Richard Nixon	
May 15, 1975		Vincent Buzek	Charge d'Affaires	Gustáv Husák	Gerald Ford	
May 4, 1976	May 21, 1976	Jaromír Johanes	(* August 21, 1933 Dobra nad Sazavou) Educated in Moscow Inst, of Int. Relations joined Ministry of Foreign Affairs 1958 later Consul-Gen. Australia Amb. to U.S.A. and Canada Deputy Foreign Minister 1982, First Deputy Foreign Minister 1987 Minister of Foreign Affairs 1988–89 Counsellor-Envoy to Turkey 1990–93, Amb. to Turkey 1993–95.	Gustáv Husák	Gerald Ford	
June 3, 1982	July 29, 1982	Jaroslav Žantovský	1972: Chargé d'Affaires of the Czechoslovak Socialist Republic, acted as the official Cuban representative in the US	Gustáv Husák	Ronald Reagan	
September 7, 1983	October 13, 1983	Stanislav Suja	(* 1940 in Vglas u Zvolena, studied journalism at Comenius University and law at Moscow's MGIMO (JUDR., 1968). Afterwards he was employed by the Czechoslovak Ministry of Foreign Affairs until his release in 1990. In 1972-75 he was assigned to the Czechoslovak permanent mission	Gustáv Husák	Ronald Reagan	
April 25, 1986	June 23, 1986	Miroslav Houštecký	(*10. 6. 1926, Horky nad Jizerou– 31. 1. 1994, Praha). 8. 12. 1983 Vyslanci Velké Británie	Gustáv Husák	Ronald Reagan	
March 1, 1990			CZECHOSLOVAK FEDERATIVE REPUBLIC*	Václav Havel	George H. W. Bush	
February 15, 1990	April 9, 1990	Rita Klímová		Václav Havel	George H. W. Bush	
October 5, 1992	November 18, 1992	Michael Žantovský		Václav Havel	George H. W. Bush	
April 4, 1997	May 14, 1997	Alexandr Vondra		Václav Havel	Bill Clinton	
October 1, 2001	October 10, 2001	Martin Palouš		Václav Havel	George W. Bush	
November 30, 2005	December 2, 2005	Petr Kolář		Václav Klaus	George W. Bush	
May 23, 2011	July 7, 2011	Petr Gandalovič		Václav Klaus	Barack Obama	
March 16, 2017	April 24, 2017	Hynek Kmoníček		Miloš Zeman	Donald Trump	
September 2, 2022	September 16, 2022	Miloslav Stašek		Miloš Zeman	Joe Biden	

== See also ==
- Czech Republic–United States relations
