= Havel's Place =

Havel's Place is a public art project, which creates a series of memorial places dedicated to the last president of Czechoslovakia and the first president of the Czech Republic, Václav Havel. The installation consists of two garden chairs around a round table, usually with a tree going through its middle. The rim of the table has the Havel Quote 'truth and love shall prevail over lies and hatred' inscribed along its rim.

== Origins ==
The original idea for Havel's Place came from Petr Gandalovič, the Czech Ambassador to the United States. He invited Bořek Šípek, an architect and designer, to create a piece of public art to represent Havel and his democratic views. Šípek had overseen a decade-long renovation of the interior of Prague Castle as President Havel's Head Architect in the 1990s, and made a number of artworks for his close friend. In the 2008 documentary about Havel, Citizen Havel, by Pavel Koutecký and Miroslav Janek, the President stated that he would like people to subconsciously connect his person with Bořek Šípek's design and art.

Šípek came up with a design symbolising "Democratic Debate", comprising two metal garden chairs placed around a table around a linden tree, the national tree of the Czech Republic. His idea was to create a gathering place in a public space to promote dialogue, discussion and freedom of speech. Bořek Šípek named the installation "Democracy Talks" and described it as "a place where people can meet and exercise their freedom of speech in a democratic dialogue with others".

Tomáš Halík, a close friend of Havel, told Czech Radio on 5 October 2013 that "the bench with the two chairs symbolises the willingness to sit down at a table and talk. That is, in my opinion, another important message left by Václav Havel: Even as people of different opinions, different political beliefs and different religions, it is still immensely important to sit down at a table and talk to one another in search for the truth."

== Partner cities ==
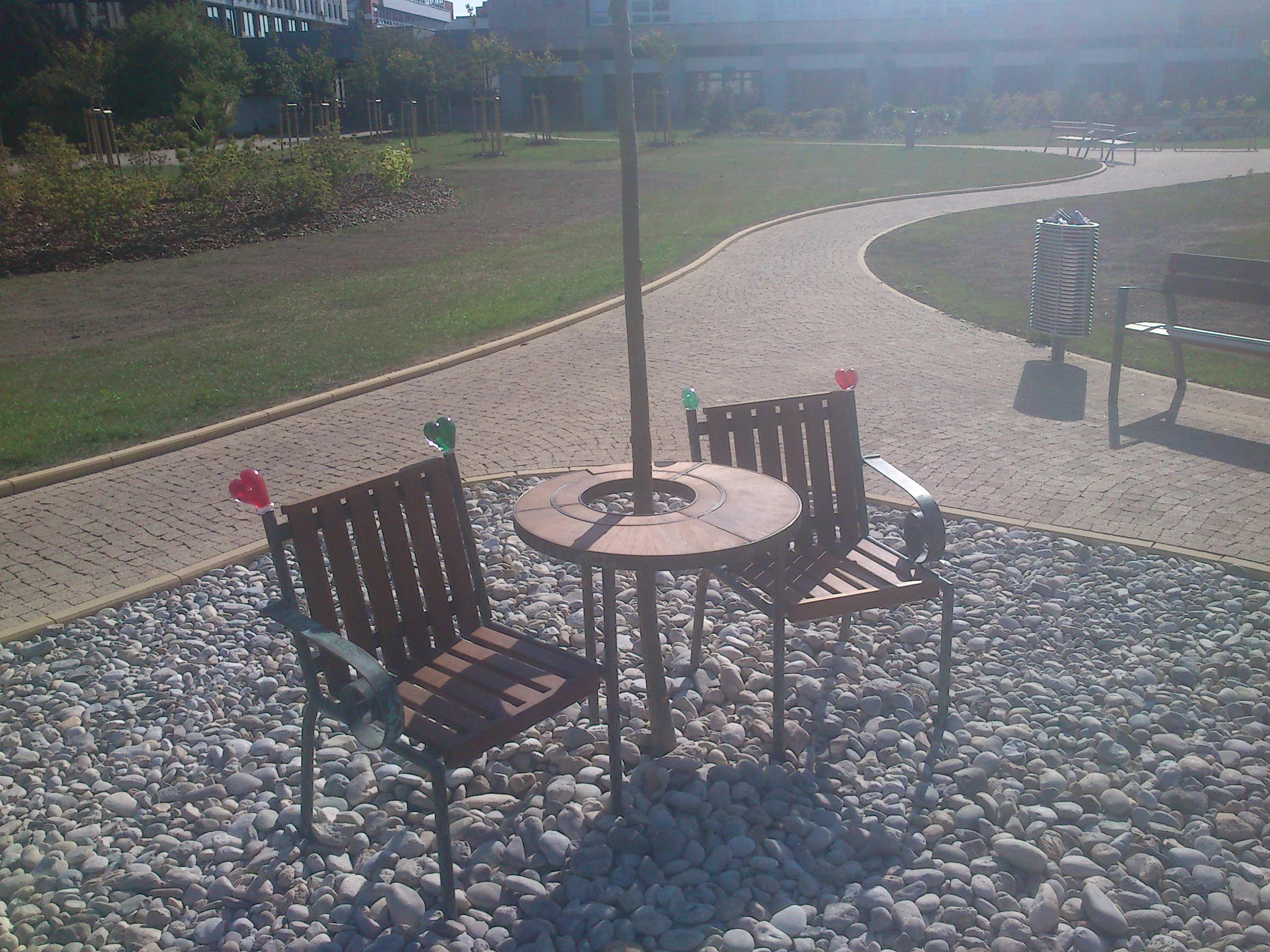
Havel's place in University of South Bohemia

The first Havel's Place was installed in the grounds of Georgetown University in Washington, D.C., on 2 October 2013, with the support of Georgetown University, the Czech Embassy, Václav Havel Library and American Friends of Czech Republic. It was dedicated by former U.S. Secretary of State Madeleine Albright and Dagmar Havlová, Havel's widow.

At a meeting in Prague a few days after the installation of the Havel's Place bench in Georgetown, Sipek met with Art for Amnesty founder Bill Shipsey who proposed that further Havel's Places would be installed in cities around the world. It was decided to start with Dublin Shipsey's home town. The Dublin "Havel's Place" was installed in St. Patrick's Park (adjacent to St. Patrick’s Cathedral) in Dublin, Ireland on Human Rights Day, 2013 (10 December) by the Lord Mayor of Dublin Oisin Quinn and Karel Schwarzenberg Havel's former Chancellor. The Dublin project was conceived and promoted by Bill Shipsey with support from the City of Dublin and the Czech Ambassador to Ireland Tomas Kafka.

The next Havel's Place, "Espai Havel", ("Havel's Place" in Catalan) was dedicated in Barcelona by the Mayor of Barcelona, Xavier Trias, and Karel Schwarzenberg on 15 February 2014 in the Parc de la Ciutadella beside the Catalan Parliament building. This Havel's Place was also conceived and promoted by Bill Shipsey.

On 1 May 2014 the fourth Havel's Place was dedicated in Maltese Square in Havel's home town of Prague.

On 11 June 2014 the fifth Havel's Place was unveiled in the University of South Bohemia in České Budějovice, as part of an international project of public places dedicated to the late Czech president.

On 27 September 2014 the sixth 'Havel's Place' was unveiled on the Campus of Venice International University, San Servolo Island. Venice in the presence of Ambassador Umberto Vattani, President of Venice International University; Petr Burianek, Czech Ambassador to Italy; Honorary Consul of the Czech Republic, Giorgio Boatto; and Professor Agar Brugiavini, the Dean of Venice International University. Michaela Jorgensen-Day and Bill Shipsey raised the money for the project.

On 4 October 2014, the 7th Havel's Place was unveiled in front of the café at the Municipal Library in Hradec Králové, Czech Republic. The creation of a Havel's Place in Hradec Králové was initiated by deputy mayor Josef Krofta.

In November 2014, two Havel's Places were unveiled to honour the 25th anniversary of the Velvet Revolution. The 8th Havel's Place was promoted by then Czech Ambassador to the U.K. Michael Zantovsky and unveiled on 6 November at Oxford University on the banks of the River Cherwell.

The 9th, promoted by Bill Shipsey and Iveta Stanislavova, was dedicated at The Hague, 8 November, at Lange Voorhout, by: Jozias van Aartsen, Mayor of The Hague; H.E. Jaroslav Horák, Ambassador of the Czech Republic to the Netherlands; Eduard Nazarski, Netherlands Amnesty International Director; and Bořek Šípek.

On 22 June 2017 a Havel's Place was unveiled in Lisbon in a collaboration between the Czech Ambassador to Portugal, Cultural Counsellor to the Camara de Lisboa Catarina Vaz Pinto and Bill Shipsey. Karel Schwarzenberg attended the dedication.

The 25th Havel's Place was unveiled in Ljubljana on 16 March 2018 by Nataša Posel, Director of Amnesty International Slovenia and Mateja Demšič Head of the Department of Culture of the City of Ljubljana. This was also promoted by Bill Shipsey and was the first Havel's Place in a city of a former communist country outside the Czech Republic.

== Václav Havel's Place ==
Václav Havel's Place No.	Date of establishment	Place	Town	Country
I.	3 October 2013	Georgetown University	Washington, D.C.	United States
II.	10 December 2013	St Patrick's Cathedral Park	Dublin	Ireland
III.	15 February 2014	Parc de la Ciutadella	Barcelona	Spain
IV.	1 May 2014	Maltézské Square	Prague	Czech Republic
V.	11 June 2014	University of South Bohemia in České Budějovice	České Budějovice	Czech Republic
VI.	27 September 2014	Venice International University	Venice	Italy
VII.	4 October 2014	Wonkova street	Hradec Králové	Czech Republic
VIII.	30 October 2014	Šafaříkovy sady	Plzeň	Czech Republic
IX.	4 October 2014	University of Oxford	Oxford	United Kingdom
X.	8 November 2014	Old City Hall	The Hague	Netherlands
XI.	19 November 2014	Míru Square	Nový Bor	Czech Republic
XII.	9 May 2015	Lewis & Clark College	Portland	United States
XIII.	7 May 2015	Sady Karla IV.	Karlovy Vary	Czech Republic
XIV.	27 October 2015	Tel Aviv University	Tel Aviv	Israel
XV.	13 November 2015	University of Pardubice	Pardubice	Czech Republic
XVI.	17 November 2015	Křinické Square	Krásná Lípa	Czech Republic
XVII.	8 March 2016	The Research Library in Liberec	Liberec	Czech Republic
XVIII.	14 September 2016	Velké Square	Kroměříž	Czech Republic
XIX.	25 September 2016	Centrum Vráž	Černošice	Czech Republic
XX.	10 October 2016	Jan Evangelista Purkyně University in Ústí nad Labem	Ústí nad Labem	Czech Republic
XXI.	18 May 2017	Horní Počernice Theatre	Prague	Czech Republic
XXII.	17 June 2017	Palacký University Olomouc	Olomouc	Czech Republic
XXIII.	22 June 2017	Jardim do Príncipe Real	Lisbon	Portugal
XXIV.	25 September 2017	Havelský park	Mladá Boleslav	Czech Republic
XXV.	16 March 2018	Northern city park	Ljubljana	Slovenia
XXVI.	6 June 2018	Strojárenská street	Košice	Slovakia
XXVII.	15 September 2018	Czech University of Life Sciences Prague	Prague	Czech Republic
XXVIII.	4 October 2018	T. G. Masaryk Town Library	Šumperk	Czech Republic
XXIX.	16 November 2018	Jardin des Alpes	Geneva	Switzerland
XXX.	5 October 2019	Kapucínské terasy	Brno	Czech Republic
XXXI.	13 November 2019	University of Milan	Milan	Italy
XXXII.	14 November 2019	T. G. Masaryka Square	Zlín	Czech Republic
XXXIII.	17 November 2019	Na Rozcestí restaurant	Čeladná	Czech Republic
XXXIV.	17 November 2019	Ivana Olbrachta street	Brandýs nad Labem	Czech Republic
XXXV.	17 November 2019	Pod Kostelem park	Tišnov	Czech Republic
XXXVI.	5 July 2020	Vajanské Embankment	Bratislava	Slovakia
XXXVII.	27 July 2020	Špalíček	Cheb	Czech Republic
XXXVIII.	21 August 2020	Kino Dukla	Jihlava	Czech Republic
XXXIX.	15 September 2021	Parque del Libro	Lima	Peru
XL.	5 October 2021	Sady Husitské revoluce	Prague	Czech Republic
XLI.	12 October 2021	Leopold Park	Brussels	Belgium
XLII.	9 November 2021	Parko Eleftherias	Athens	Greece
XLIII.	7 December 2021	Hiroshima Shudo University	Hiroshima	Japan
XLIV.	10 December 2021	Zámecký park	Jičín	Czech Republic
XLV.	13 June 2022	The Jean Monnet House	Bazoches-sur-Guyonne	France
XLVI.	11 August 2022	Lázeňský park	Poděbrady	Czech Republic
XLVII.	17 November 2022	Smetanovo nábřeží	Prague	Czech Republic
XLVIII.	17 November 2022	Komenského náměstí	Kutná Hora	Czech Republic
XLIX.	17 November 2022	Ivana Olbrachta street	Mnichovo Hradiště	Czech Republic
L.	13 February 2023	University of Ostrava	Ostrava	Czech Republic
LI.	17 November 2023	Stodůlky	Prague	Czech Republic
LII.	20 December 2023	Czech Embassy, 15 avenue Charles Floquet, Paris	Paris	France
LIII.	29 May 2024	Pavillon Bosio	Monaco	Monaco
LIV.	1 June 2024	Church of God's Love	Budislav	Czech Republic
LV.	8 May 2025	Park Makasiinipuisto	Helsinki	Finland
LVI.	23 May 2025	Platz vor dem Grafeneckart	Würzburg	Germany
LVII.	26 May 2025	Yangjae-cheon Park	Seoul	South Korea
LVIII.	3 October 2025	náměstí Míru	Krnov	Czech Republic
LIX.	17 November 2025	Osvoboditelů street	Lovosice	Czech Republic
LX.	22 November 2025	Centre Dürrenmatt Neuchâtel	Neuchâtel	Switzerland
LXI.	3 June 2026	Daan Forest Park	Taipei	Taiwan
LXII.	17 September 2026	Jemniště Castle	Postupice	Czech Republic
LXIII.	18 September 2026	National Czech & Slovak Museum & Library	Cedar Rapids	United States
LXIV.	21 September 2026	Mariánské náměstí	Prague	Czech Republic
LXV.	5 October 2026	Metzlerpark	Frankfurt	Germany
LXVI.	15 October 2026	Silesian University in Opava	Opava	Czech Republic
LXVII.	11 November 2026	Nidelva promenade below Samfundet	Trondheim	Norway
LXVIII.	17 November 2026	Millak-dong	Busan	South Korea
LXIX.	18 November 2026	Mały Rynek	Opole	Poland
