= Czech Republic–United States relations =

- Czech Republic: United States

Diplomatic mission
- Embassy of the Czech Republic in Washington, D.C.: Embassy of the United States, Prague

Envoy
- Ambassador Miloslav Stašek: Ambassador Bijan Sabet

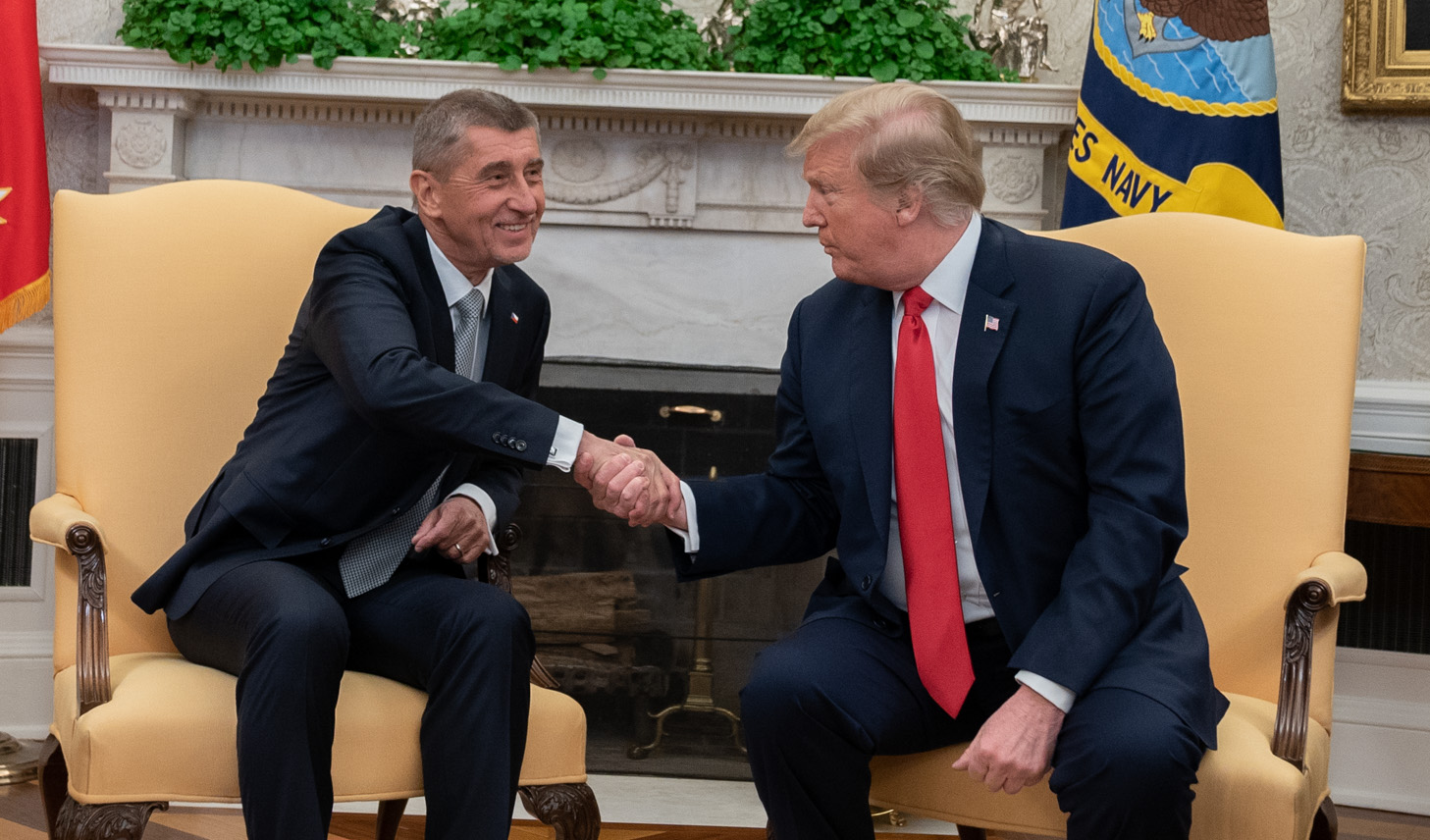
Prime Minister of Czech Republic Andrej Babiš (left) and US President Donald Trump (right) shake hands in the White House in March 2019

Relations between the Czech Republic and the United States were officially established in 1918, but has been cut throughout the history, exactly between 1948–1989 when the Czech Republic (at that time as Czechoslovakia) was under the soviet influence.

Since transitioning into a democracy in 1989, joining NATO in 1999, and the EU in 2004, the Czech Republic has gradually become a close economic partner and formal military ally of the United States, drastically improving bilateral ties in the years since through increasingly extensive cooperation in areas ranging from counterterrorism to cultural exchanges.

According to the 2012 U.S. Global Leadership Report, 39% of Czechs approve of the job performance of the U.S. leadership, with 26% disapproving and 35% uncertain. Both countries are also observer states of the BSCE.

== History ==
=== Post–World War I ===
U.S. President Woodrow Wilson and the United States played a major role in the establishment of Czechoslovakia on October 28, 1918. President Wilson's 14 Points, including the right of ethnic groups to form their own states, were the basis for the union of the Czechs and Slovaks. Tomáš Garrigue Masaryk, the father of the state and its first President, visited the United States during World War I and worked with U.S. officials in developing the basis of the new country. Masaryk used the U.S. Constitution as a model for the first Czechoslovak constitution.

=== Post–World War II and communist Czechoslovakia ===
After World War II, the Czechoslovak government-in-exile returned. Normal relations continued until 1948, when the communists seized power and relations froze rapidly. The Soviet invasion of Czechoslovakia in August 1968 further complicated U.S.-Czechoslovak relations. The United States referred the matter to the United Nations Security Council as a violation of the United Nations Charter, but no action was taken against the Soviets.

=== Velvet Revolution ===
Since the Velvet Revolution of 1989, bilateral relations have improved immensely. Dissidents once sustained by U.S. encouragement and human rights policies reached high levels in the government. President Václav Havel, in his first official visit as head of Czechoslovakia, addressed the U.S. Congress and was interrupted 21 times by standing ovations. In 1990, on the first anniversary of the revolution, President George H. W. Bush, in front of an enthusiastic crowd on Prague's Wenceslas Square, pledged U.S. support in building a democratic Czechoslovakia. Toward this end, the U.S. Government has actively encouraged political and economic transformation.

The U.S. Government was originally opposed to the idea of Czechoslovakia forming two separate states, due to concerns that a split might aggravate existing regional political tensions. However, the U.S. recognized both the Czech Republic and Slovakia on January 1, 1993. Since then, U.S.–Czech relations have remained strong economically, politically, and culturally.

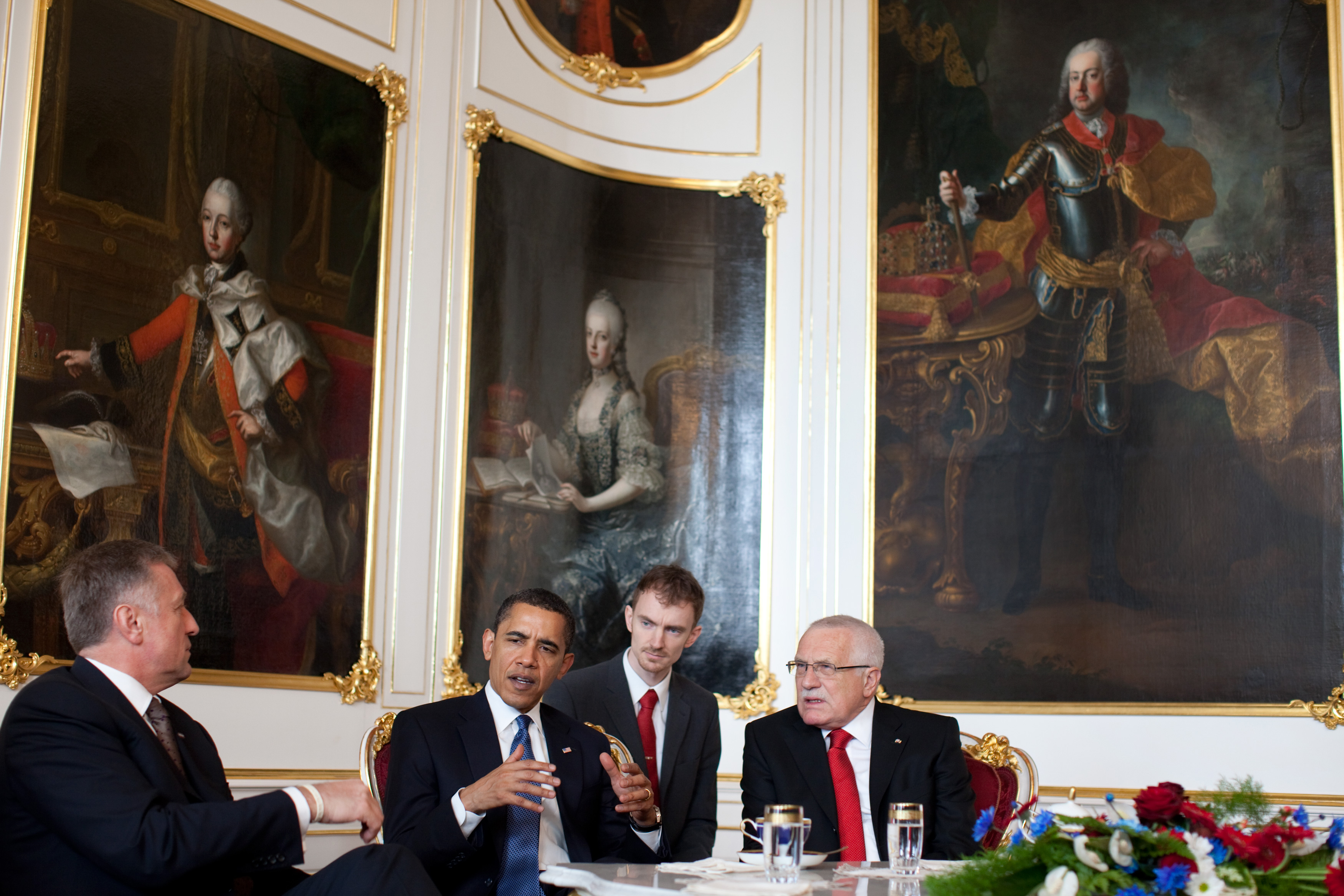
Mirek Topolánek, Barack Obama and Václav Klaus at a meeting

== Current issues ==
=== Iraq War and Global War on Terror ===
In 2003, the Czech Government sent a small contingent of elite anti-chemical weapons warfare experts to Kuwait to support the then-impending U.S. led 2003 invasion of Iraq. Despite governmental support for the war, an overwhelming majority of Czechs opposed the U.S. led invasion of Iraq throughout the lead up to the war and immediately following the invasion. A public opinion poll conducted in March 2003 found that over 70 percent of the population opposed the war even with a UN mandate while 83 percent of Czechs were against the war in Iraq without a mandate. Furthermore, the same poll found that 82 percent of Czechs believe that the U.S. bases its foreign policy "according to its own power and economic interests." Czech opposition to the war did not amount to the level of massive visible street demonstrations such as those seen in other cities around the world. On February 15, 2003, 1,500 people attended a rally against the war in Wenceslas Square in Prague.

=== Missile defense system ===
A missile defense system was planned to be installed at Brdy part of the Czech Republic. It would have been an X band radar system that would work with a missile site in Redzikowo, Poland.

In August 2008, the Czech Security Information Service (BIS) published the report for the year 2007, in which it says that Russian secret agents (spies) have been from the beginning highly influencing the public opinion against the building of U.S. radar in Czech republic. In September 2008 Czech Military Counter-intelligence confirmed the report of BIS. "BIS claims, that the Russian espionage is currently at high intensity and level." Russians secret agents mainly influence the people, that can have a great influence on public opinion. After Barack Obama was elected the President of the United States, there were speculations that he might stop the project. The final decision to scratch the plans was announced on 17 September 2009 by a phone call from Obama to Czech Prime Minister Jan Fischer.

In June 2011, Alexandr Vondra, a Czech defense minister, told the U.S. that his country was withdrawing from the European missile defense system, stating: "We will seek other opportunities for the Czech Republic to participate in the Alliance system in the future; but this does not change anything about our support for NATO missile defense."

In January 2014, the Czech government approved of the sale of 28 sub-sonic L-159 military planes in a deal worth up to $25.8 million to the United States.

=== Czech Role as Protecting Power in Syria ===
As of February 2012, due to the escalating Syrian civil war, the U.S. Embassy in Syria closed down. After the Polish embassy also closed, the Czech Republic in its stead assumed protecting power responsibility for the United States.

All U.S. citizens needing help are directed to go to the Embassy of The Czech Republic in Damascus. The US State Department's travel tips include "The Government of the Czech Republic, acting through its Embassy in Damascus, serves as Protecting Power for U.S. interests in Syria. The range of consular services the Czech Republic provides to U.S. citizens is extremely limited, and those services may require significantly more processing time than at U.S. embassies or consulates outside of Syria."

== Resident diplomatic missions ==
- the Czech Republic has an embassy in Washington, D.C. and consulates-general in Chicago, Los Angeles and New York City.
- the United States has an embassy in Prague.
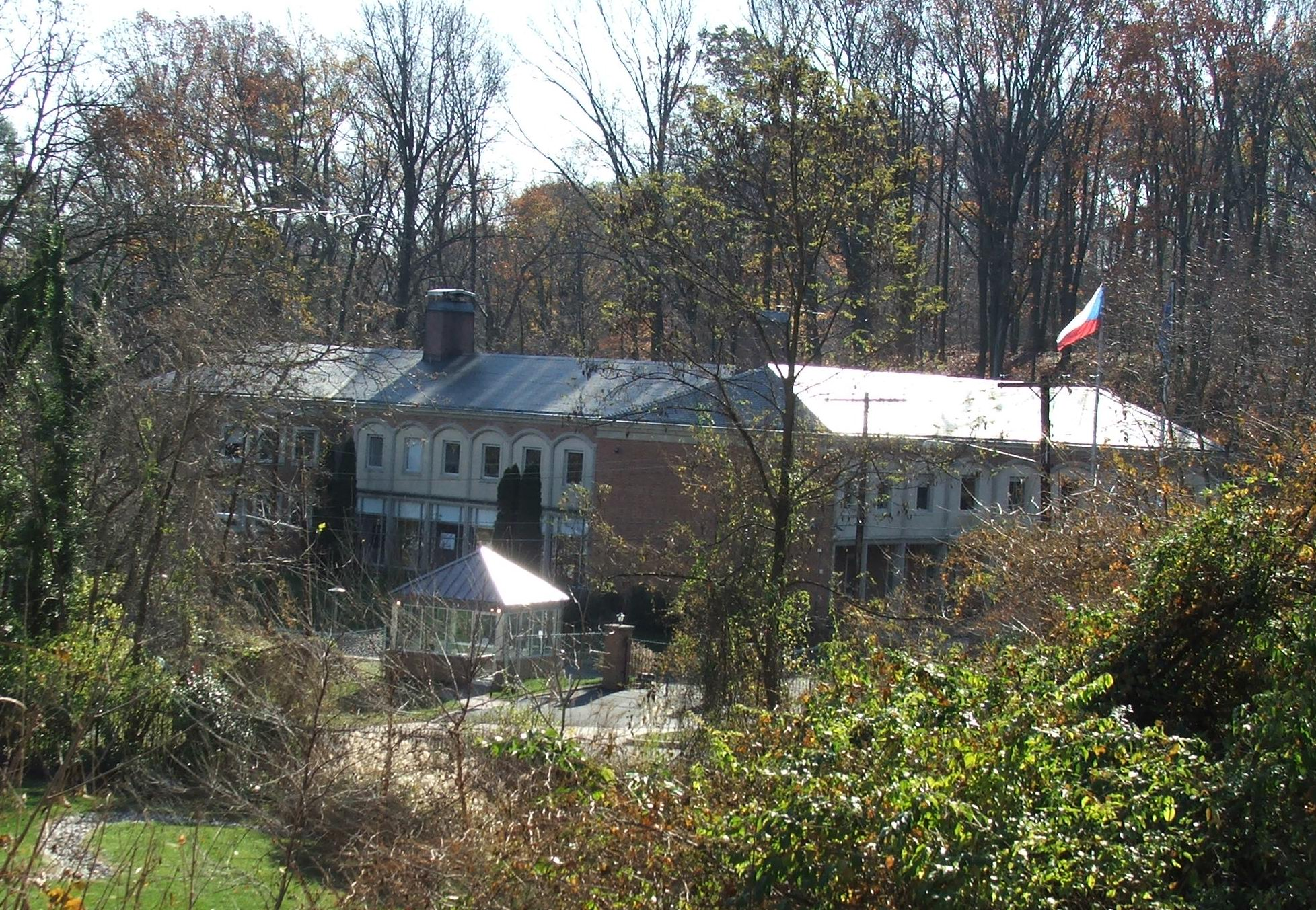
Embassy of the Czech Republic, Washington, D.C.

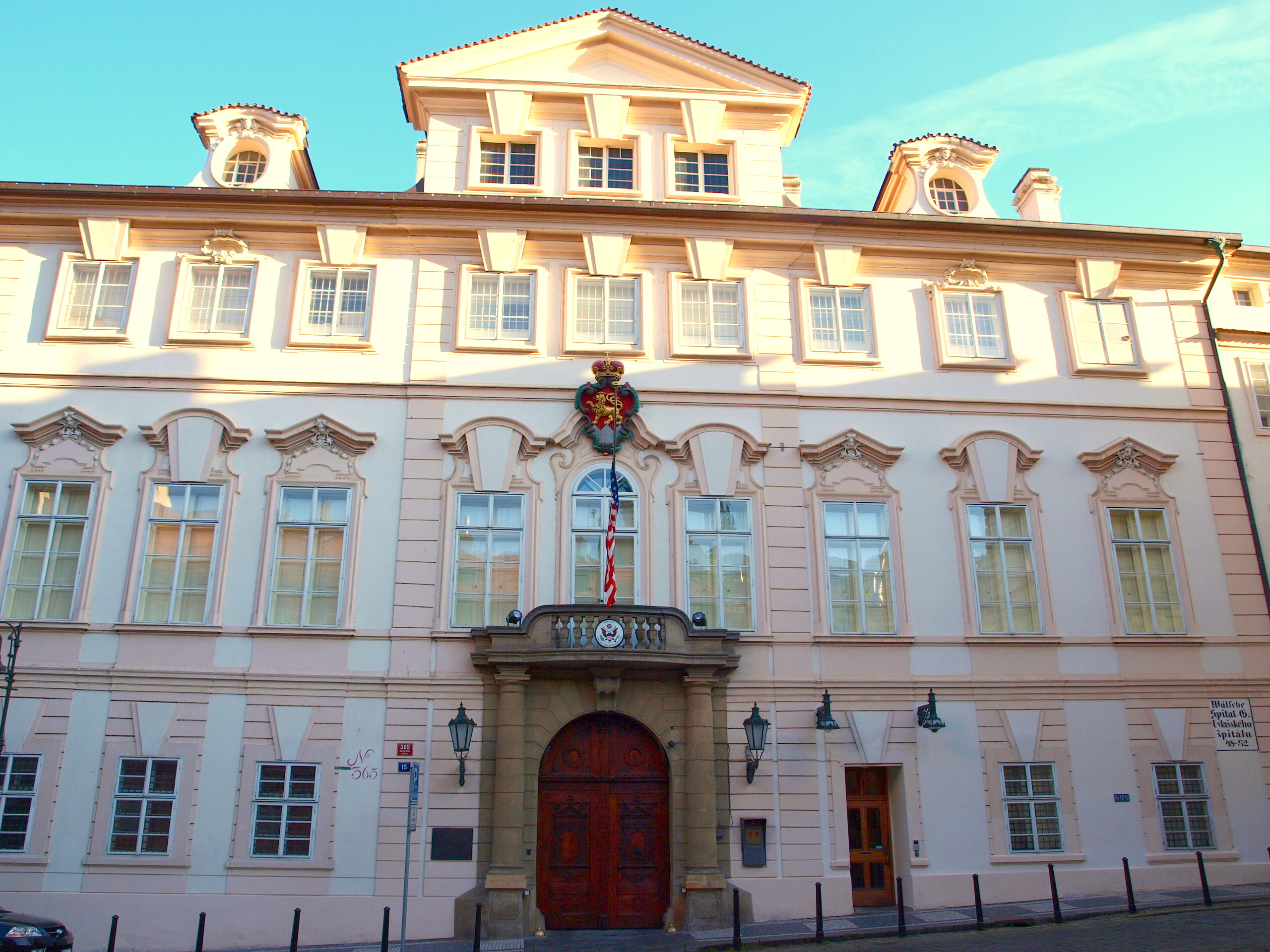
Embassy of the United States, Prague

== See also ==
- Foreign relations of the Czech Republic
- Foreign relations of the United States
- United States-EU relations
- NATO-EU relations
- Czech Americans
- List of Czech Americans
