= Elsbeth Hamilton =

Czechoslovak-born British radio operator (1920–2025)

Elsbeth Hamilton (5 December 1920 – 3 May 2025) was a Czechoslovak-born British radio operator, World War II veteran, and social worker, who served in the Royal Air Force's Women's Auxiliary Air Force with the rank of Lance Corporal 2nd Class. Hamilton was the last known surviving Czechoslovak veteran of World War II in the United Kingdom.

== Biography ==
Hamilton was born Eliška Süsslandová to a Czech Jewish family on 5 December 1920, in the Vinohrady district of Prague, Czechoslovakia. She fled to the United Kingdom following the 1938 Munich Agreement, in which Nazi Germany annexed the Sudetenland region of Czechoslovakia, and settled in Oxford, England.

Following the outbreak of war between the United Kingdom and Nazi Germany, Hamilton enlisted in the Royal Air Force's Women's Auxiliary Air Force in 1943, where she served as a radio operator. In a January 2025 interview with Czech ambassador to the United Kingdom, Marie Chatardová, Hamilton recalled her decision to join the British war effort, "I said to myself that war is ugly, and I'm selling soap here...I have to do something... There was an office on the street in Oxford where I lived, I joined the Royal Air Force. They put me in the signal department, where I learned Morse code. I was in various departments all over England, and eventually I was put at an airport near Oxford, where I was in charge of connecting with planes that were leaving or returning to the airport."

Hamilton briefly returned to Czechoslovakia after World War II, where she discovered that most of her family had been murdered in the Holocaust and their property confiscated. She returned permanently to the United Kingdom and studied social work and psychiatry at both Oxford University and the London School of Economics. She married a British historian and anthropologist. The couple lived and worked in Nyasaland (present-day Malawi) and Uganda for eight years. She pursued a career as a children's psychiatric social worker at a hospital in Bristol upon their return to England.

During the 2020s, the Embassy of the Czech Republic, London, discovered Elsbeth Hamilton and her World War II service through a program called "Children of Heroes", which explores the lives of Czech and Czechoslovak military veterans through interviews with their children.

On 24 January 2025, Czech Defense Minister Jana Černochová awarded Hamilton the National Defense Cross for her service during World War II.

Hamilton died in Oxford on 3 May 2025, at the age of 104. She was the last surviving Czechoslovak veteran of World War II in the United Kingdom, and one of just 67 surviving Czech veterans of World War II, as of 2025.
