= Bill Shipsey =

Human rights activist

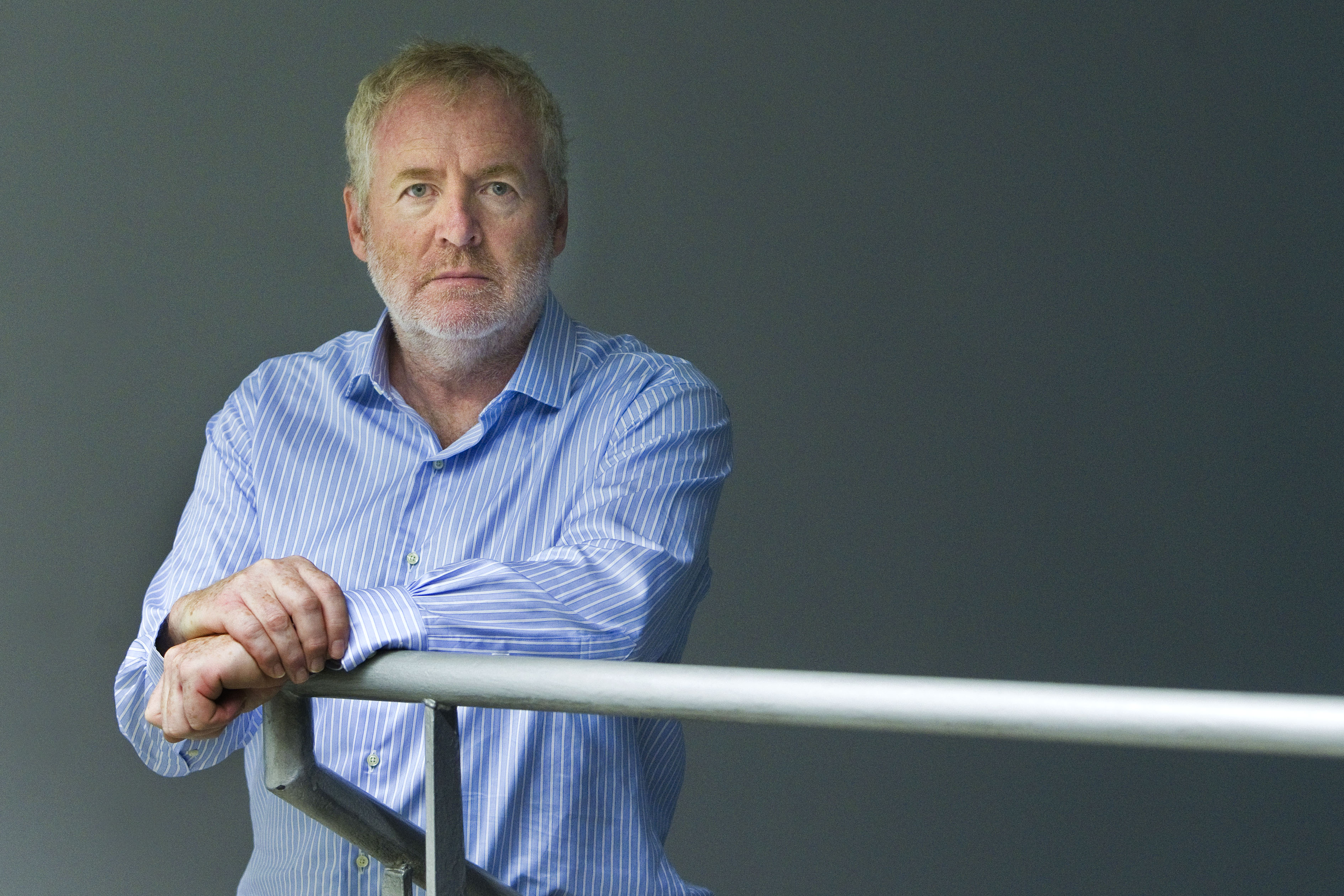
- Born: 22 June 1958 (age 68); Waterford, Ireland
- Education: Castleknock College, University College Dublin, Kings Inns
- Occupation: Human Rights Activist (Retired Barrister)
- Organisation(s): Founder of Art for Human Rights (formerly Art for Amnesty) and Co-Founder of Art 19

Bill Shipsey (born 22 June 1958) is an Irish human rights activist, barrister (retired), artist event promoter, producer and consultant. He is the founder of Art for Amnesty, Amnesty International's global artist engagement programme, and the co-founder of Art 19. In November 2022 Art for Amnesty changed its name to Art for Human Rights. Shipsey remains its Executive Director. Art for Human Rights brings together artists of all disciplines in a collaborative effort to support human rights organisations including Amnesty International through the medium of the arts.

Since 2018 he has lived in Paris.

== Art for Human Rights (formerly Art for Amnesty) ==
=== Music projects ===
Shipsey joined Amnesty International in the late 1970s, inspired in part by the activism of entertainers, who performed at the Monty-Python-esque 'Secret Policeman's Ball' benefit show. As founder of Art for Amnesty, Shipsey has brought together a number of world-renowned artists for music, literary, visual art and other artist lead projects that benefit Amnesty:

1. Shipsey was co-executive producer of 'Instant Karma', Amnesty's multi-star benefit album of John Lennon compositions. So far the album has raised over $7m in royalties for Amnesty. The album hit number one on iTunes stores around the world and was nominated for several Grammies. Shipsey said the idea was "to allow Amnesty to engage with the iPod-listening, music-downloading, 16-to-26-year-olds. [The album] enabled us to reach out and engage young kids in a way we hadn't for years."
2. He devised and produced the Small Places Tour, a 2008 music concert project which partnered with over 800 concerts in some 40 countries worldwide.
3. From 2009–2019 he oversaw the participation of Amnesty on U2's and Sting's global tours.
4. In October 2010, he partnered with German entrepreneur Jochen Wilms and their mutual musician friend Carl Carlton to create a commemorative song for Amnesty's 50th Anniversary. This led to the groundbreaking Art for Amnesty Band 'Toast to Freedom' song with contributions from nearly 50 singers from all over the world. 'Toast To Freedom' was launched worldwide on 3 May 2012.
5. Shipsey also promoted and produced 'Electric Burma', a concert held on 18 June 2012 in honour of Burmese leader Aung San Suu Kyi featuring Bono, Damien Rice, Lupe Fiasco, Bob Geldof, Angelique Kidjo and many others.
6. He co-executive produced 'Bringing Human Rights Home' a concert for Amnesty USA held on 5 February 2014, benefitting Amnesty USA in the Barclays Center in Brooklyn, New York.
7. In May 2015 he produced and directed two concerts and several other artist events in Mexico City for Amnesty entitled 'Desde Aqui' to mark the opening of the Amnesty International regional hub for the Americas in Mexico City. One of the concerts featured renowned Venezuelan pianist Gabriella Montero and the other Saul Hernandez, Caifanes and Lila Downs.
8. In 2017 he launched "Eleanor's Dream" a one-year artist lead project to mark the 70th Anniversary of the UDHR and to celebrate the achievement of Eleanor Roosevelt in its creation and adoption. Internationally acclaimed singer/songwriter Damien Rice performed a sell-out acoustic concert in the Olympia in Paris on 11 December.

=== Ambassador of Conscience Award ===
Shipsey conceived and created the Ambassador of Conscience Award. The Award Ceremonies were produced as Art for Amnesty events from 2003 to 2015. The Award has been bestowed on such diverse activists as Nelson Mandela, Malala Yousafzai, Harry Belafonte, Václav Havel, Joan Baez, Ai Wei Wei, Peter Gabriel, U2 and most recently Greta Thunberg. The Ambassador of Conscience Award was inspired by Irish poet Seamus Heaney, a supporter of Amnesty for over 30 years. Heaney dedicated a poem to Amnesty entitled "From the Republic of Conscience" in 1985.

=== Memorial projects ===
==== Tapestries ====
Since 2012 Shipsey has conceived and commissioned fourteen monumental memorial tapestries. They have mainly been funded by artist supporters of Amnesty International including Bono and Edge of U2, Sting, Peter Gabriel, Yoko Ono, Paul Simon and John Legend, and honour, among others, Václav Havel, Seamus Heaney, Nelson Mandela, John Lennon and the people of Colombia and Greece. These tapestries are to be found at various airport and museum locations around the world. Eleven of the tapestries, the Amnesty-Sís-Pinton Tapestries, were designed by New York-based Czech artist Peter Sís. The tapestry for Colombia, "The Musicians", was designed by Fernando Botero. The tapestry for Greece, "I love Greece", was designed by Sophia Vari. The tapestry "El Holocausto", was made after a fresque by Manuel Rodríguez Lozano in Mexico City in 1944. El Holocausto has been displayed in Paris at UNESCO HQ in 2020. In Seminario 12 in Mexico City. In the GPO in Dublin in 2024. At the U.N. in Geneva in January 2025 and in Strasbourg at the Council of Europe from November 2026 to January 2026. All but one of the tapestries were created by weavers at Ateliers Pinton in Felletin-Aubusson, France.

==== Bronze statuary ====
Since 2014 Shipsey has commissioned and promoted six bronze busts of Václav Havel, six of Eleanor Roosevelt, three of Oscar Wilde in 2025, two of Chinese dissident and Nobel Peace Prize winner Liu Xiaobo and one of Chinese human rights defender Cao Shunli this one in partnership with ISHR. In January 2026 he commissioned a bust of Samuel Beckett to mark the 120th anniversary of Beckett's birth in April 1906.

He has also been instrumental in promoting and placing several 'Havel's Place' memorial benches, designed by his late friend Bořek Šípek, in parks and public spaces in Dublin, Barcelona, Venice, The Hague, Lisbon and Ljubljana, to honour the late Czech President, playwright and dissident Václav Havel.

==== Azulejo murals ====
In 2018 he began to work with internationally acclaimed Azulejo maker Viuva Lamego in Sintra, Portugal to produce Azulejo murals, the traditional Portuguese majolica glazed tiles.

Shipsey and Peter Sis partnered with the City of Lisbon to create a large Azulejo mural to commemorate the 70th Anniversary of the Universal Declaration of Human Rights (UDHR). The 15 square meter mural of Sis' drawing "Si morg" was unveiled on 10 December 2018, on Human Rights Day, by Katerina Vaz Pinto, the cultural counsellor of the city de Lisbon.

In February 2019, Peter Sis was commissioned to design another Azujelo mural to mark the 30th Anniversary of the Velvet Revolution. This 70 metre long and 3.6-metre high mural is completed and awaits installation in Prague in the spring of 2026.

In 2020, a 10 square meter Ana Juan designed Azulejo mural, entitled "Solidarity", was commissioned by Shipsey for the city of Paris. It too has been created and is awaiting installation in Paris.

=== Book projects ===
==== Anything Can Happen: A Poem and an Essay ====
Anything Can Happen: A Poem and an Essay, is a unique poetry book by Irish Poet Seamus Heaney. Based on Horace's Odes, Heaney reflects upon the relevance of art in the political context of the twenty-first century. It was translated into 23 languages, in association with Art for Amnesty and for the support of Amnesty International.

==== Windows On Elsewhere: 60 Refugees, 60 Views ====
A collaboration between Art for Amnesty, and Turin-based artist and architect Matteo Pericoli which began in March 2018 gave rise to a unique project: Windows on Elsewhere, 60 Refugees, 60 views. The window view drawings of 60 refugees from around the world and their short stories of their journeys from 'elsewhere'.

This project was completed and launched in Fondazione Sandretto Re Rebaudengo in Turin in May 2021. It comprises a book in Italian published by Il Saggiatore and a limited-edition box set of drawings and stories by each of the 60 refugees in Italian, English, French and Spanish sponsored by the Lavazza Fondazione. The drawings and stories have been exhibited in Turin in 2021. Lugano in Switzerland in 2022. Mexico City and Guadalaja in 2023. The Botanical Museum of Padua in the summer of 2025. And at Castello di Ama in Tuscany since September 2025.

== Art 19 ==
In 2018, together with German friends Mike Karstens and Burkhard Richter, Jochen Wilms, he co-founded Art 19 GmbH to raise money for Amnesty International from the sale of artwork prints by the world’s leading contemporary artists.

The name ‘Art 19’ is a play on Article 19 of Universal Declaration of Human Rights which declares that: "Everyone has the right to freedom of opinion and expression."

Art 19 Box One was launched in November 2019 and was exhibited at the meCollectors Room Berlin, MAMCO in Geneva, the DOX Centre for Contemporary Art in Prague, and at The Grand Palais in Paris.

== Education ==
After attending National School in Dunmore East, County Waterford Shipsey's secondary education was at Castleknock College in Dublin. He gained his Bachelor of Civil Law degree at University College Dublin (1976–79), and his Barrister at Law degree from King's Inns Dublin (1979–80).

== Awards ==
Shipsey is the recipient of the 2022 UCD Alumni Award in Law And the Czech Republic's 'Distinguished Contribution to Diplomacy' Medal in 2024

== Professional memberships ==
- Bar of Ireland, 1980
- Bar of England & Wales, 1987
- Bar of Northern Ireland, 1989

== Professional experience ==
- Junior Counsel Irish Bar, 1980–1994
- Senior Counsel Irish Bar, January 1994 – 2018

As a Barrister, Shipsey appeared for Amnesty International before the Court of Justice of the European Union.

He has consulted widely with other human rights organisations around the world seeking to partner with artists in the promotion of human rights campaigns.

== Organisations ==
- Art for Amnesty: Founder, May 2002 and Director 2003 - 2022
- Art for Human Rights (formerly Art for Amnesty): Director November 2022 - present
- Art 19: Co-Founder 2018
- Amnesty International Irish Section: Board member & chair, May 1984 – November 1987
- Amnesty International: International Executive Committee board member, November 1987 – August 1989
- Boroumand Center for Human Rights in Iran: Board member & Former Chair.
- Centre Culturel Irlandais (Paris): Strategy Committee board member
- Free Legal Advice Centres: Board member & chair, October 1978 – May 1980
- Irish Hospice Foundation: Board member & chair, March 2001 – July 2004
- Narrative4 Ireland: Board Member
- Poetry Ireland: Board member, 2016 — 2020
- Rights and Security International (U.K.): Patron
- The Estate of Seamus Heaney: Board member 2016 - 2021
- The Václav Havel Center: Board member 2017-2025
