= Milena Vicenová =

Czech diplomat & politician (born 1955)

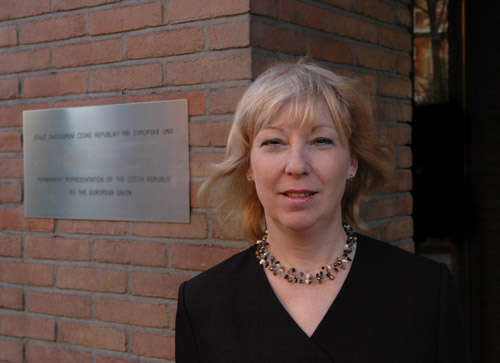

Minister of Agriculture
- In office 4 September 2006 – 9 January 2007
- Prime Minister: Mirek Topolánek
- Preceded by: Jan Mládek
- Succeeded by: Petr Gandalovič

Personal details
- Born: 12 August 1955 (age 71) Přerov, Czechoslovakia
- Party: Independent (nominated by Civic Democratic Party) (2006 – 2007)
- Education: University of Veterinary Sciences Brno

Milena Vicenová (born 12 August 1955, in Přerov) is a former Minister of Agriculture of the Czech Republic. After that she became an EU project manager of the Technology Agency of the Czech Republic. She had also been the Czech Ambassador to the European Union.
