= Petr Gandalovič =

Czech politician

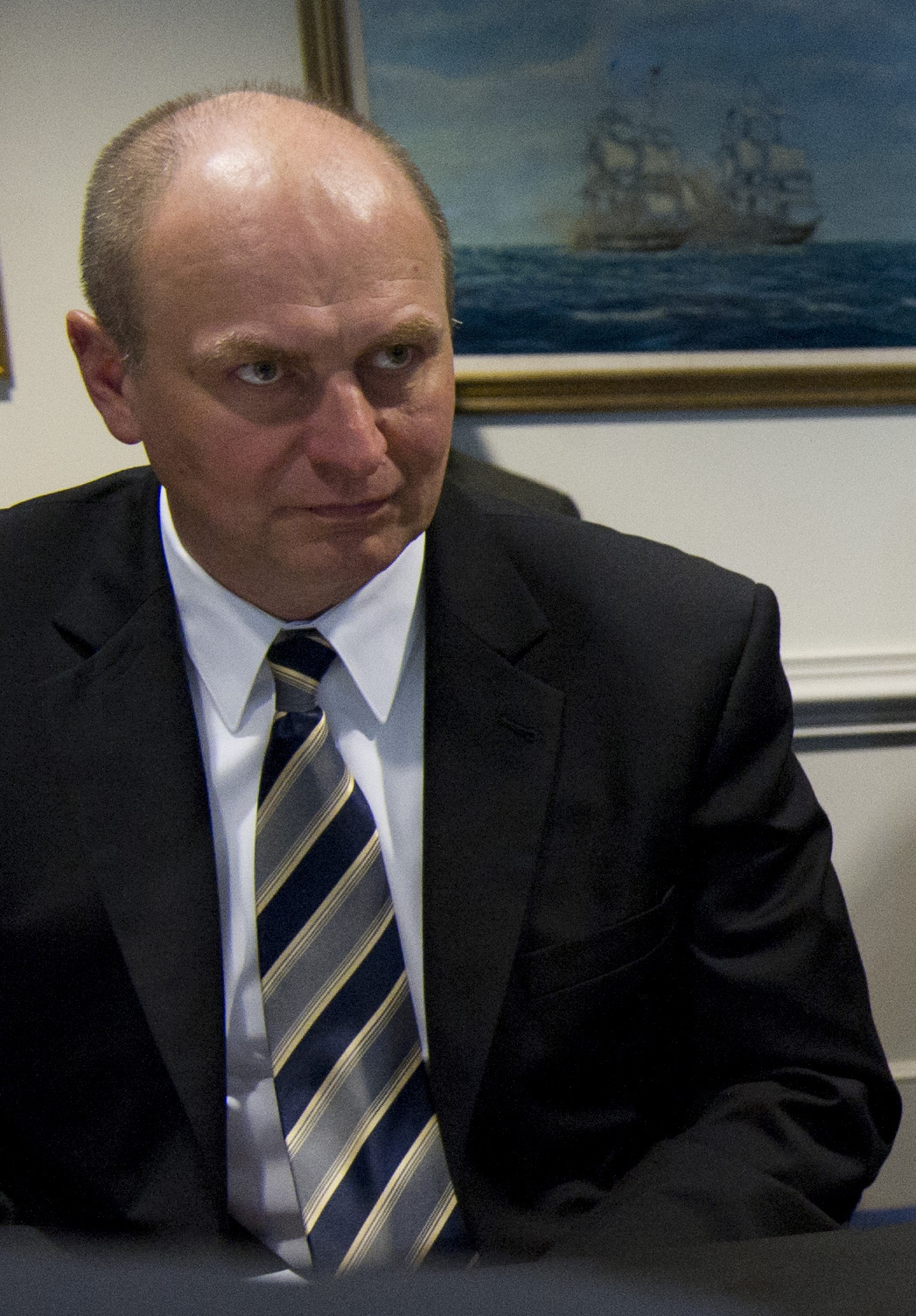

Czech Republic Ambassador to the United States
- In office 7 July 2011 – 16 January 2017
- President: Václav Klaus; Miloš Zeman
- Preceded by: Petr Kolář
- Succeeded by: Hynek Kmoníček

Minister of Agriculture
- In office 9 January 2007 – 8 May 2009
- Prime Minister: Mirek Topolánek
- Preceded by: Milena Vicenová
- Succeeded by: Jakub Šebesta

Member of the Chamber of Deputies
- In office 3 June 2006 – 1 March 2011

Personal details
- Born: 15 August 1964 (age 61) Prague, Czechoslovakia
- Party: ODS

Petr Gandalovič (born 15 August 1964) is a Czech politician and one of the founding members of the Civic Democratic Party. He served as the Czech Ambassador to the United States from 2011 to 2017.

== Education ==
Gandalovič attended secondary school in Ústí nad Labem from 1978 to 1982, continuing on to the School of Mathematics and Physics at Charles University in Prague from 1982 to 1987. He subsequently taught in a secondary school in Ústí nad Labem until 1990.

== Political career ==
In 1989, Gandalovič was a founder member of the Civic Forum, and was elected as a Member of the Federal Assembly in 1990. The following year he was one of the founders of the breakaway Civic Democratic Party.

In 1992 he was appointed Deputy Minister of Environment, and in 1994 he became an adviser to the Minister of Foreign Affairs. Between 1997 and 2002 he was the Consul General of the Czech Republic in New York City, before returning to the Czech Republic to serve one term as the Mayor of Ústí nad Labem.

In 2006 Gandalovič was one of four people appointed Vice-chairman of the Civic Democratic Party, alongside Ivan Langer, Petr Bendl, and Petr Nečas. He served in the First Cabinet of Mirek Topolánek as Minister for Regional Development (2006–2007) before being named as Minister for Agriculture in January 2007 in Topolánek's Second Cabinet, which was dissolved in May 2009 after the government lost a vote of no confidence.

Gandalovič became Czech Ambassador to the United States in 2011, remaining in the post until being replaced in 2017 by Hynek Kmoníček.
