= Hynek Kmoníček =

Czech diplomat

Czech Republic Ambassador to Vietnam
- Incumbent
- Assumed office 1 September 2022
- President: Miloš Zeman; Petr Pavel
- Preceded by: Vítězslav Grepl

Czech Republic Ambassador to the United States
- In office 16 March 2017 – 31 August 2022
- President: Miloš Zeman
- Preceded by: Petr Gandalovič
- Succeeded by: Miloslav Stašek

Chief Foreign Policy Advisor to the President
- In office 28 March 2013 – 15 March 2017
- President: Miloš Zeman
- Preceded by: Ladislav Mravec
- Succeeded by: Rudolf Jindrák

Czech Republic Ambassador to Australia
- In office 17 May 2011 – 20 March 2013
- President: Václav Klaus; Miloš Zeman
- Preceded by: Juraj Chmiel
- Succeeded by: Martin Pohl

Czech Republic Ambassador to India
- In office 10 October 2006 – 2009
- President: Václav Klaus
- Preceded by: Jaromír Novotný
- Succeeded by: Miloslav Stašek

Czech Republic Ambassador to the United Nations
- In office 23 October 2001 – 2006
- President: Václav Havel; Václav Klaus
- Preceded by: Vladimír Galuška
- Succeeded by: Martin Palouš

Personal details
- Born: 22 October 1962 (age 63) Pardubice, Czechoslovakia (now Czech Republic)
- Party: ČSSD
- Spouse: Indira Gumarova
- Education: University of South Bohemia; Charles University in Prague

Hynek Kmoníček (born 22 October 1962) is a Czech diplomat and the current Czech Ambassador to Vietnam. Previously, Kmoníček served as foreign policy advisor of the President Miloš Zeman, and held ambassadorial posts including Czech Permanent representative to the United Nations in New York and subsequently as Ambassador to India, Australia, the United States, and Vietnam.

== Early life and education ==
Kmoníček was born in Pardubice, then Czechoslovakia, in 1962. He graduated from the University of South Bohemia with a master's degree in classical guitar and pedagogy, and later earned degrees in English language studies and Classical Arabic studies from Charles University. He also completed a post-graduate program in the modern history of the Middle East at the Hebrew University of Jerusalem (Young Jewish Leaders in Diaspora, Rothberg Overseas Program). At Hebrew University, his specialization was medieval Islamic mysticism. His graduation thesis was entitled "Al-Miraj of Abu Yazid al-Bistami". His political science graduation paper was titled "Historical development of Saudi-American relations from the beginning to the JFK era."

== Career ==
Kmoníček started his diplomatic career in 1995 as a desk officer at the Middle East Department of the Ministry of Foreign Affairs. He became director of this Department in 1997. In 1999, Kmoníček was promoted to the position of Director General of Asia, Africa and America. His next promotion came in June 1999, when he was named Deputy Minister, with responsibility for Czech bilateral relations with all non-EU countries. He held this position until 2001.

From 2001 to 2006, Kmoníček served as Czech Ambassador to the United Nations in New York. As a member of the UN General Assembly, Kmoníček served as Chairman of the Fifth Committee, which is responsible for administration and budgetary matters. Between 2006 and 2009, he was Czech Ambassador in India, also responsible for Bangladesh, Nepal, the Maldives and Sri Lanka.

In 2009, he was appointed to the position of Deputy Foreign Minister for Legal, Consular, and Current Political Issues. After his removal from the position of Deputy Foreign Minister in July 2010, Foreign Minister Karel Schwarzenberg nominated him for the post of Czech Ambassador in Australia, also responsible for New Zealand, Cook Islands, Fiji, Solomon Islands, Tonga, Vanuatu, and Samoa. Schwarzenberg was reported to have commented that if possible, he would rather have sent Kmoníček to Mars.

A longtime friend of President Milos Zeman, Kmoníček joined the Presidential Office on 28 March 2013 as Director of the Foreign Department with primary responsibility for the President's policy on foreign affairs. He was considered to be a key figure within the Zeman administration, advising the president on Middle Eastern, Asian and American affairs. In 2015, he was credited by the US Ambassador Andrew Schapiro as having resolved a diplomatic dispute between Schapiro and Zeman.

From March 2017 to August 2022, Kmoníček served as Czech Ambassador to the United States. He presented his credentials to President Donald Trump on 24 April 2017. He also retained his post of foreign policy adviser to President Zeman. He finished his term in this post in August 2022, and was subsequently appointed as the Czech Ambassador to Vietnam.

Since 2015 he has been writing about foreign affairs for the Czech newspaper MF Dnes as an external contributor.

== Personal life ==
Kmoníček's personal interests include cooking and collecting documentary movies, world music and hot sauces from around the world. He also writes reviews for art, culture and academic journals worldwide. In a profile in August 2018 for CBS News, his house in Washington DC was shown to be decorated with trophies from various animals he had killed around the world as part of his diplomatic activities.

In 2015, a Czech scientist who discovered a new species of beetle named it after Kmoníček as a token of a gratitude for assistance he had provided as ambassador.
