= Jan Mládek =

Czech economist and politician

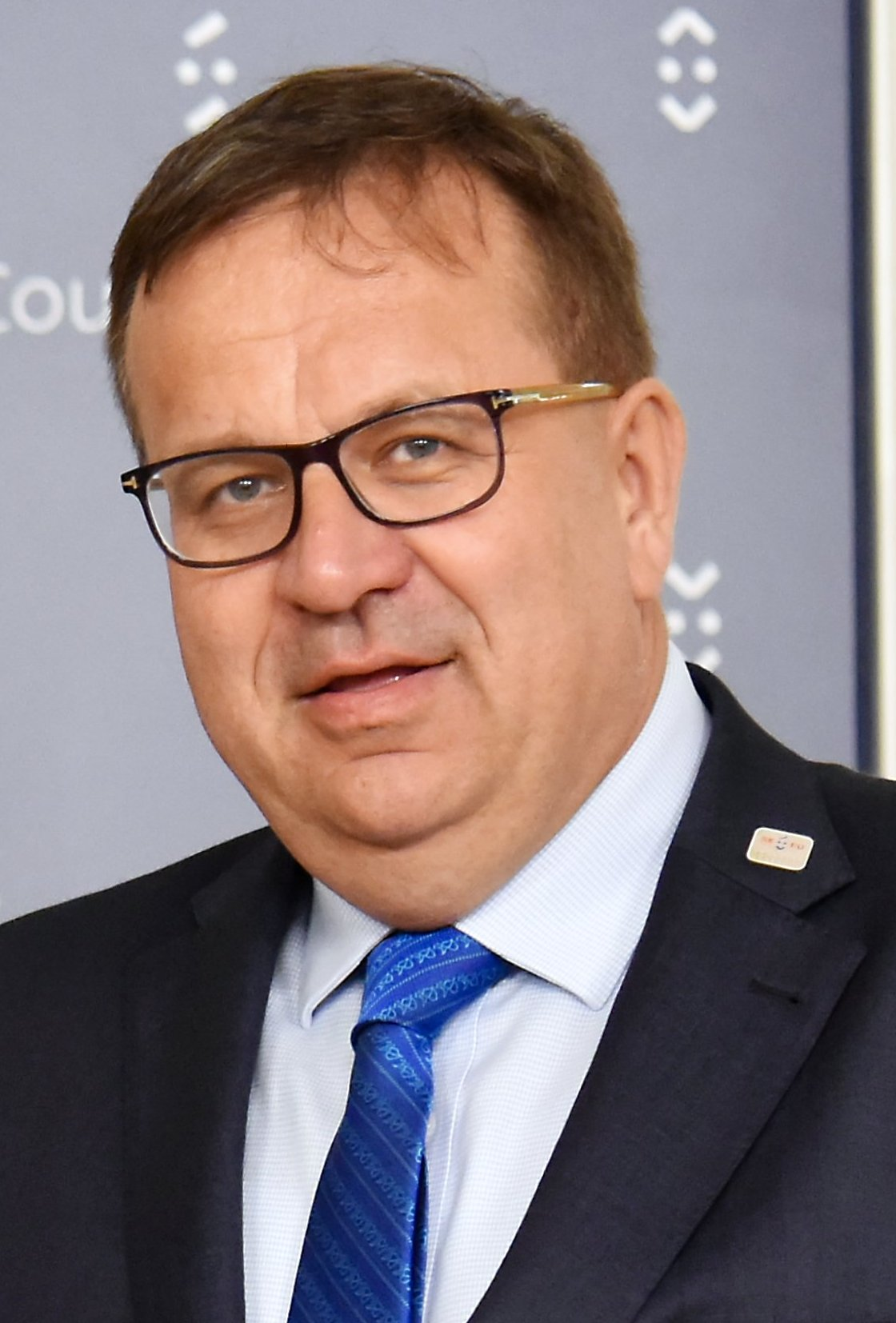

11th Minister of Industry and Trade
- In office 29 January 2014 – 28 February 2017
- Prime Minister: Bohuslav Sobotka
- Preceded by: Jiří Cieńciała
- Succeeded by: Bohuslav Sobotka (Acting)

5th Minister of Agriculture
- In office 16 November 2005 – 4 September 2006
- Prime Minister: Jiří Paroubek
- Preceded by: Petr Zgarba
- Succeeded by: Milena Vicenová

Member of the Chamber of Deputies
- In office 26 October 2013 – 26 October 2017
- In office 15 June 2002 – 2 December 2005

Personal details
- Born: 1 June 1960 (age 66) Jindřichův Hradec, Czechoslovakia
- Party: Communist Party of Czechoslovakia (1987–1989); Czech Social Democratic Party (since 1995)
- Website: Official website

Jan Mládek (born June 1, 1960) is a Czech economist and Social Democratic politician who served as Minister of Industry and Trade from 2014 to 2017. Between 2005 and 2006 Mládek also was Minister of Agriculture in Paroubek's cabinet. He also served as a member of the Chamber of Deputies.

Mládek graduated from University of Economics in Prague in 1983. Then in the years 1985–1990 he studied at the Forecasting Institute of the Czech Academy of Sciences, where in April 1990 he received the title of Candidate of Sciences. Moreover, he spent two years studying (1987–1989) Mathematics and Physics at Charles University in Prague.

He is married and has five children.

In 1991 he worked as an assistant at the Department of Economics at Faculty of Social Sciences of Charles University. In the years 1991–1992 he worked in the position of advisor to the Federal Minister of Economics and later as his Deputy Minister. In the period from 1992 to 1995 Mládek worked as an external advisor to the Minister of Industry and Trade. From 1993 to 1998 he cooperated with the Central European University in Prague / Budapest in the study of transformation and privatization of the post-communist countries of Central and Eastern Europe. In the period of 1998 to 1999 he served as Deputy Vice Prime Minister for Economic Policy and from 1999 to May 2001 he was the First Deputy Minister of Finance. From 1999 to 2001 he was Vice-Governor of the International Monetary Fund for the Czech Republic.

In the 2002 elections Mládek was elected to the Chamber of Deputies for the Social Democrats. He was a member of the Budget Committee and in 2002–2004 also the Foreign Committee. He remained in the Chamber of Deputies until December 2005, when he resigned his mandate. In 2004–2005, he worked as an economic advisor to the Prime Minister and subsequently became a member of the Cabinet. In November 2005 he was appointed as the Minister of Agriculture in the Paroubek's government. He retained this position until August 2006, when that term of government ended.

Within the Czech Social Democratic Party he is active as the Chairman of the party's Economic Policy Committee. He also holds the post of the party's shadow finance minister.

In 2001 he requested that the National Security Agency carry out a “classified” level screening but it refused to grant a screening at that level, with him only acquiring the lowest ranking of “restricted”.

In January 2014 he was the ČSSD candidate for the post of Minister of Industry and Trade in the Government of Bohuslav Sobotka. On 29 January 2014 he was appointed to this position. He has been active in the ČSSD as President of the party’s National Economic Commission. During the period from 2008–2009 he was Director of the Masaryk Workers’ Academy. In October 2006 he was again appointed Director of the Czech Institute of Applied Economics. Until the start of the year 2014 he was the Chairman of FONTES RERUM, a cooperative for economic, political and social studies.

Jan Mladek speaks fluent English, Russian and Polish.

== Bibliography (selection) ==
- Mládek, J. (1987): Shortage – the Barrier of Modeling Consumption in Centrally Planned Economy. Ekonomicko-matematický obzor 23, ISSN 0013-3027, nr. 2, pages 156 - 170
- Mládek, J. (1989): Selected Problems of Modeling Consumption in a CPE: the Case of Czechoslovakia 1955–1986. Jahrbuch der Wirtschaft Osteuropas 13, nr. 2, Munich, pages 195 - 205
- Mládek, J. (1993): The Different Paths of Privatization (Czechoslovakia 1990 - ?) in: Earle, J.; Frydman, R.; Rapacyznski, A. (eds.): Privatization in the Transition to a Market Economy; Pinter Publishers, London, United Kingdom, 1993, pages 121 - 146
- Hashi I., Mládek, J. (1993): Voucher Privatization, Investment Funds and Corporate Governance in Czechoslovakia, British Review of Economic Issues 15, nr. 37, October 1993, pages 67 – 96
- Mládek, J. (1994): Voucher Privatization in the Czech Republic and Slovakia, in: Mass Privatization – An Initial Assessment, OECD, Paris, 1994
- Mládek, J. (1994): Czech Privatization Process: Time for Corporate Governance, Forschungsbericht 9410, Ludwig Boltzmann Institute, Germany, 18 pages
- Dlouhý, V., Mládek, J. (1994): Privatization and Corporate Control in the Czech Republic, Economic Policy, Lundy, December 1994, pages 155 - 170
- Mládek, J. (1997): Is Czech Voucher Privatization a Success? Transitions, pages 92 – 95
- Mejstřík, M., Mládek, J. (1997): The Privatization Process in East-Central Europe – Evolutionary Process. Kluwer Academic Publishers, USA
- Hashi, I., Mládek, J. (2000): Fiscal and Regulatory Impediments to the Entry of New Firms in Five TR, Journal of East-West Business, Haworth Press, Binghamton NY, USA, pages 59 – 94
- Mládek, J. (2001): Hospodářský růst a veřejné rozpočty (Economic growth and public budgets), Trend no. 3, Volume 8, July 2001
- Mládek, J. (2001): Národní kapitalismus v Čechách a co sním dál? (National capitalism in the Czech Republic and what am I dreaming of now?) Respekt, 10. 9. 2001
- Mládek, J. (2002): Kupónová privatizace: politický úspěch, ekonomické selhání (Coupon privatisation: political success, economic failure), Symposium of the Centre for Economics and Politics
- Mládek, J. (2003): Kdo neodjel, volil komunisty (If they did not leave, they voted Communist), Respekt 28. 1. 2003, p. 8
- Mládek, J. (2003): Kousnutí do kyselého jablka (Grasping the nettle), Literární noviny, July 2003
- Mládek, J. (2003): Reforma veřejných financí: těžká zkouška pro ČSSD (Public finance reform: tough test for the ČSSD), Trend no. 5, Volume 10 October 2003, p. 9
- Mládek, J. (2004): Nalejme si čistého vína aneb o hospodářské politice ČR v 21. století (Coming clean, or the economic policy of the Czech Republic in the 21st century), Trend no. 4, Volume 11, page 3
- Mládek, J. (2005): Rovná daň – pohled domácí – český (Equal taxation – a domestic view – Czech), Právo, 21. 5. 2005, page 23
- Mládek, J. (2006): Budoucnost českého venkova je EAFRD (The future of the Czech countryside lies with the EAFRD), Právo, 31. 1. 2006, page 13
- Mládek, J. (2007): Přijměme euro už v roce 2012 (We will adopt the euro as early as 2012), Hospodářské noviny 22. 2. 2007
