= Rita Klímová =

Czech diplomat and economist

Czechoslovakia Ambassador to the United States
- In office 9 April 1990 – August 1992
- President: Václav Havel
- Preceded by: Miroslav Houštecký
- Succeeded by: Michael Žantovský

Personal details
- Born: Rita Budínová; 10 December 1931 Iași, Romania
- Died: 30 December 1993 (aged 62) Prague, Czech Republic
- Party: Communist Party of Czechoslovakia (1945-1970); Civic Forum (1989-1992)
- Spouse(s): Zdeněk Mlynář, Zdenek Klima
- Children: Vladimír Mlynář; Milena Bartlová
- Occupation: Diplomat, economist

Rita Klímová, née Rita Budínová (10 December 1931 – 30 December 1993) was a Czech economist and politician. She was Czechoslovakia's ambassador to the United States before Czechoslovakia's dissolution during the Velvet Divorce in 1992.

== Early life ==
Klímová was born in Romania. Her father was Stanislav Budín (née Bencion Bať), a prominent Communist writer who used the pen name Batya Bat. Due to their Jewish ancestry, her family fled to the United States not long after Nazi Germany invaded Czechoslovakia in 1939. She settled in New York City in 1939, returning to Czechoslovakia in 1946 to finish her education. As a result, for the rest of her life she spoke American English with an "industrial-strength" New York accent.

== Academic career ==
Like many Central Europeans of her generation, Klímová was initially an ardent Communist. She joined the Communist Party of Czechoslovakia in 1948. While still a university student, she took a job in a factory in order to get closer to the working class. Also while still in school, she married the intellectual Zdeněk Mlynář.

After graduation, she rose high in the academic world, becoming an economics lecturer at Charles University. Initially a strict Stalinist, she helped purge many of her more liberal colleagues from Charles University during the 1950s and early 1960s. However, during the Prague Spring of 1968, she was very attracted to Alexander Dubček's reform program and helped supply inside information to the Western media. She continued to support reform after the Warsaw Pact invasion of Czechoslovakia, and was fired from her university post and expelled from the party in 1970.

== Dissident ==
Like many prominent academics who supported the Prague Spring, Klímová found it all but impossible to have a livelihood for much of the Normalization era. She eventually found work as a translator, but lost that job in 1977 after her father, who had also become disillusioned with Communism, signed Charter 77. Years later, she said that she wanted to sign as well, but Mlynář (who had divorced her in 1967) told her they did not want her signature.

During the 1970s and 1980s, she became one of the more prominent Czechoslovak dissidents, and one of the main contacts between the dissidents and the Western media. She frequently hosted meetings of dissident economists in her apartment. One of the attendees was future Czech prime minister and president Václav Klaus. By this time, she had become convinced of the need to adopt a market economy; she wrote many samizdat articles on economic matters under the pen name "Adam Kovář"—Czech for Adam Smith.

She became a household name during the Velvet Revolution, when her longtime friend Václav Havel asked her to translate for him. Havel was looking for someone who could convey Civic Forum's message to English-speaking audiences. Havel believed that since Klímová spoke American English, she'd play very well with American audiences. Havel himself spoke very good English, but thought his accent would be too thick for English speakers to understand. She was actually the first person to coin the term "Velvet Revolution."

== Ambassador to the United States ==
Just months after the collapse of the Communist government, newly sworn in Foreign Minister Jiří Dienstbier, another longtime friend, asked Klímová to become the new government's ambassador to the United States, even though she had no diplomatic experience.

During her tenure, she did much to win support for the democratizing regime. She resigned in August 1992, four months before her country's breakup.

== Death ==
Klímová was diagnosed with leukemia not long after taking up her ambassadorial post. She finally died of the disease on 30 December 1993. She is buried at the Jewish cemetery in Telč.
