= Michael Žantovský =

Czech polymath (born 1949)

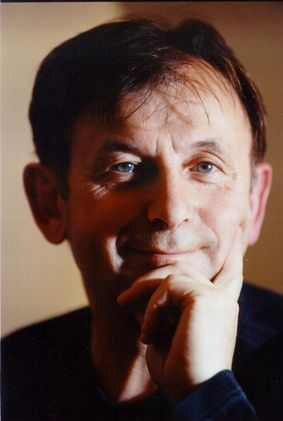

Senator from Prague 5
- In office 23 November 1996 – 23 November 2002
- Preceded by: Established
- Succeeded by: Miroslav Škaloud

Czech Republic Ambassador to the United Kingdom
- In office 5 October 2009 – 31 August 2015
- President: Václav Klaus; Miloš Zeman
- Preceded by: Jan Winkler
- Succeeded by: Miroslav Škaloud

Czech Republic Ambassador to the State of Israel
- In office 2004–2009
- President: Václav Klaus
- Preceded by: Daniel Kummerman
- Succeeded by: Tomáš Pojar

Czechoslovakia and Czech Republic Ambassador to the United States
- In office 19 November 1992 – February 1997
- Preceded by: Rita Klímová
- Succeeded by: Alexandr Vondra

Leader of the Civic Democratic Alliance
- In office 17 June 2001 – 2002
- Preceded by: Daniel Kroupa
- Succeeded by: Jiřina Nováková
- In office March 1997 – 29 November 1997
- Preceded by: Jan Kalvoda
- Succeeded by: Jiří Skalický

Personal details
- Born: 3 January 1949 (age 77) Prague, Czechoslovakia
- Party: Civic Democratic Alliance (1996–2007); Independent (nominated by TOP 09) (2020)
- Spouse: Jana Žantovská
- Education: Charles University
- Profession: Diplomat, politician, translator, author, journalist and lyricist

Michael Žantovský (born 3 January 1949) is a Czech polymath, translator, educator and former diplomat and politician. He is a former Ambassador of the Czech Republic to the United Kingdom, as well as to Israel and the United States. He is a foreign policy advisor to the President of the Czech Republic Petr Pavel.

== Education, background, scientific work ==
Born in Prague in a literary family, he was educated at the Faculty of Arts of the Charles University, Prague (B.A. summa cum laude in clinical and social psychology, 1973) and McGill University, Montreal. From 1973 until 1980 he worked in the Psychiatric Research Institute in Prague, where he did research in the fields of theory of motivation and sexual behavior. He left the Institute in 1980 and worked as a free-lance translator, lyricist and publicist. He contributed to the underground press. In 1988-89 he worked as the Prague correspondent for Reuters, the international news agency.

With his first wife, playwright and journalist Kristina Žantovská, they have a daughter Ester (*1980) and son Jonáš (*1984). With his second wife, Jana Žantovská, a photographer working under the nom de plume Jane Noseková, they have a son David (*2001) and daughter Rebeka (*2003).

== Political and diplomatic career ==
During the Velvet Revolution in 1989 he was among the founding members of the Civic Forum, the umbrella organization coordinating the overthrow of the communist regime, and became its press spokesman. In January 1990 he became the spokesman, press secretary and advisor to President Václav Havel. From 1992 until 1997 he served as the Ambassador of Czechoslovakia and subsequently (from January 1993) the Czech Republic in the United States.

In November 1996, he was elected to the Czech Senate in a Prague district. From 1996 until 2002 he was the Chairman of the Senate Committee on Foreign Affairs, Defense and Security. He initiated and co-drafted, inter alia, the Czech Freedom of Information Act of 1999.

In March 1997, he was elected leader of the Civic Democratic Alliance (ODA), a liberal conservative party, member of the governing coalition. He was the vice-president of the party from 1998 until 2001, when he was again elected the party's leader.

In 2002, he returned to the Czech Foreign Service. From 2003 until 2009 he served as the Ambassador of the Czech Republic to the State of Israel. Since October 2009 until September 2015, he was the Ambassador of the Czech Republic to the United Kingdom.

In 2003, he was the co-founder and first executive director of the Program of Atlantic Security Studies (PASS), a part of the think-tank Prague Security Studies Institute (PSSI).

Since July 2012, Žantovský served as President of the Aspen Institute Prague and member of the Board of Trustees of the Aspen Institute.. He is now the Honorary President of Aspen Institute Central Europe.

From 2015 till 2023, he was the Executive Director of the Václav Havel Library.

He teaches diplomacy and foreign policy at the Prague CEVRO University, the NYU in Prague, and the CERGE-EI Institute.

== Literary work ==
He translated more than fifty works of fiction, drama and poetry, of mostly contemporary American and British writers, including works by James Baldwin, Norman Mailer, Joseph Heller, E.L. Doctorow, Nadine Gordimer, Toni Morrison, Tom Stoppard et al. He translated films and short stories of Woody Allen, and wrote a monograph on his life and work (1990). He translated also non-fiction works by Henry Kissinger, Madeleine Albright, Joshua Muravchik et al. From Hebrew he translated the memoirs of Amos Oz A Tale of Love and Darkness.

With his first wife he co-authored a play, The Poor Mouth (1985) based on a short novel by Myles na gCopaleen (Brian O'Nolan).

He has written and published many essays and articles on foreign policy, current affairs and literature. He co-authored the book Freedom of Information in the Legal System of the Czech Republic (2002).

In 2014, his biography of Václav Havel wait a sec. published both in Czech and English (Atlantic Books) and subsequently in more than ten other languages. His thriller The Cooldown (Ochlazení, Prostor, 2008, initially published under pseudonym Daniel Wolf) has been hailed as an early warning of the Russian aggression against Ukraine and Europe. In 2023, he published a book of beletristic memoirs Begging Your Pardon (S prominutím řečeno, Prostor, Prague).
