= Art 19 =

German company supporting human rights organizations by selling artworks

- Formation: 2018
- Type: GmbH
- Headquarters: Germany
- Official language: English
- Website: art-19.com

Art 19 is a German company that supports human rights organizations by raising funds through the sale of artworks. It was founded by four associates, Mike Karstens, Burkhard Richter, Bill Shipsey and Jochen Wilms, with backgrounds in the fields of art, law and human rights.

== Overview ==
The name “Art 19” is an abbreviation of Article 19 of the Universal Declaration of Human Rights. The idea for Art 19 came from supporter of Amnesty International, Jochen Wilms, when he learned in 2012 that Pablo Picasso had donated artworks for Amnesty. He teamed up with the founder of Art for Amnesty, Bill Shipsey, gallerist Mike Karstens and lawyer Burkhard Richter to establish Art 19 in 2018 as a registered GmbH.

=== Box One ===
Box One is the first initiative of Art 19 in partnership with Amnesty International. The purpose of the initiative is to raise funds to support Amnesty International's human rights work. Through this project, eleven notable artists from the world have created ten original signed fine art prints, in a limited-edition of 100 copies. The artists are Ayşe Erkmen, Shilpa Gupta, Emilia & Ilya Kabakov, William Kentridge, Shirin Neshat, Yoko Ono, Gerhard Richter, Chiaru Shiota, Kiki Smith, and Rosemarie Trockel. Since its launch on December 10, 2019, in Berlin at MeCollectorsRoom, Art 19 Box One has organized four art exhibitions in Berlin, Prague, Paris and Geneva. The cost of each box is reported to be 50 thousand euros.
