= List of ambassadors of the Czech Republic to the United Kingdom =

The list of ambassadors of the Czech Republic to the United Kingdom contains the heads of the diplomatic mission of the Czech Republic in the United Kingdom of Great Britain and Northern Ireland.

In terms of historical contacts, the marriage of Anne of Bohemia, who married King Richard II of England in 1382, became significant. Then, in 1613, Princess Elizabeth Stuart became the wife of Frederick V of the Palatinate, the king of Bohemia in 1619. Already at the end of World War I, Great Britain recognized the Czechoslovak National Council as the basis of the future Czechoslovak government by its government's declaration of 9 August 1918. Based on the document, a bilateral agreement was signed on 3 September of the same year, in which the British cabinet recognized the right of the National Council to participate in peace conferences of the allies and the establishment of a Czechoslovak diplomatic representative in London. In 1919, Štefan Osuský became the first such envoy. In January 1993, the Czech Republic established with the United Kingdom the previous diplomatic relations of the Czechoslovak State Department.

== Ambassadors of the Czech Republic ==
- 1993–1997, Karel Kühnl
- 1997–2003, Pavel Seifter
- 2003–2005, Štefan Füle
- 2005–2009, Jan Winkler
- 2009–2015, Michael Žantovský
- 2015–2021, Libor Sečka
- 2021–2025, Marie Chatardová
- from 2025, Václav Bartuška

== See also ==
- Czech Centres
- List of diplomatic missions of the Czech Republic
