= Alexandr Vondra =

Czech politician and diplomat (born 1961)

Alexandr Vondra MEP
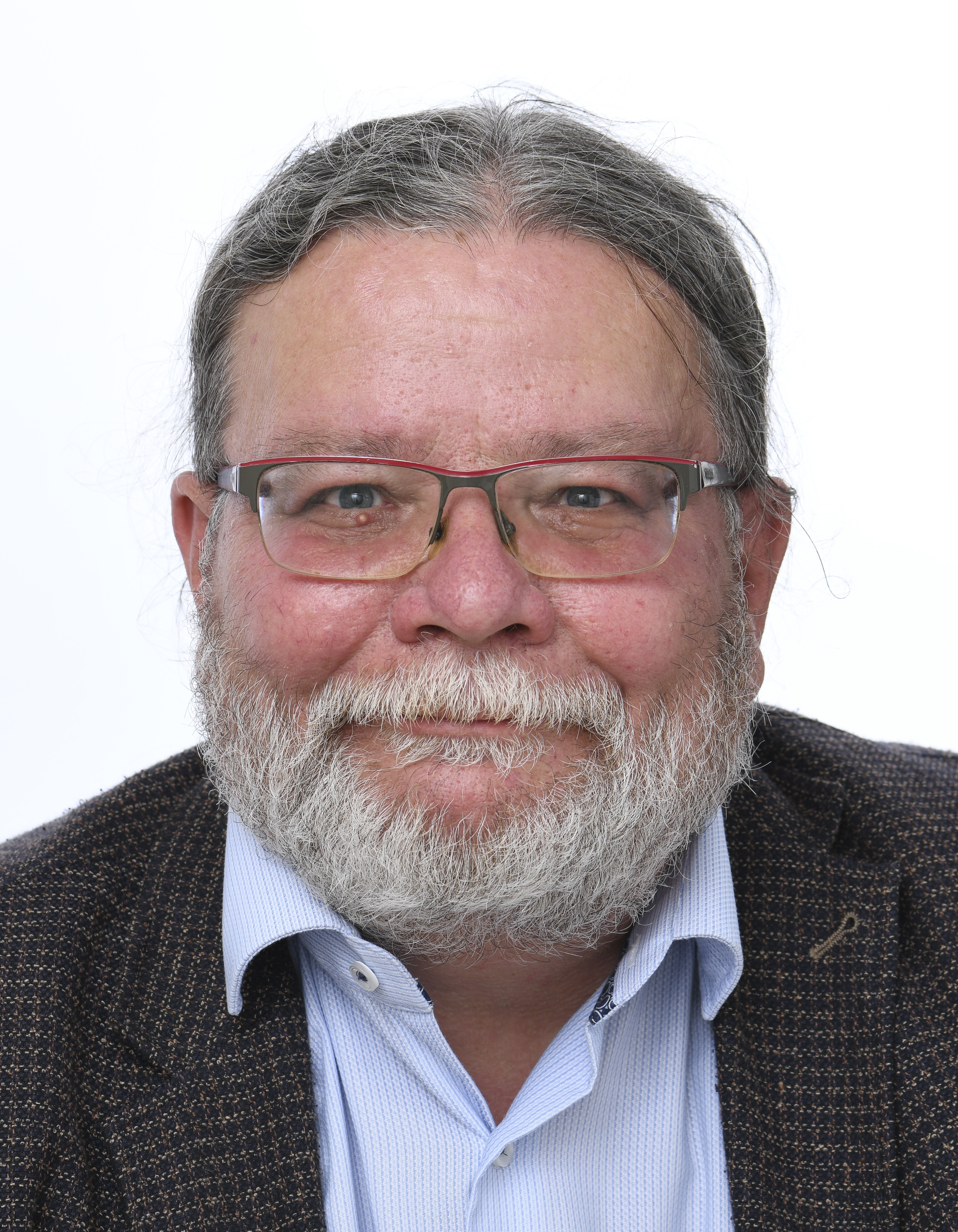
- Official portrait, 2024

Member of the European Parliament for the Czech Republic
- Incumbent
- Assumed office 1 July 2019

Minister of Defence
- In office 13 July 2010 – 7 December 2012
- Prime Minister: Petr Nečas
- Preceded by: Martin Barták
- Succeeded by: Karolína Peake

Deputy Prime Minister for European Affairs
- In office 9 January 2007 – 8 May 2009
- Prime Minister: Mirek Topolánek
- Preceded by: Position established
- Succeeded by: Štefan Füle (as Minister)

Minister of Foreign Affairs
- In office 4 September 2006 – 9 January 2007
- Prime Minister: Mirek Topolánek
- Preceded by: Cyril Svoboda
- Succeeded by: Karel Schwarzenberg

Senator from Litoměřice
- In office 28 October 2006 – 28 October 2012
- Preceded by: Zdeněk Bárta
- Succeeded by: Hassan Mezian

Czech Republic Ambassador to the United States
- In office 14 May 1997 – 10 October 2001
- President: Václav Havel
- Preceded by: Michael Žantovský
- Succeeded by: Martin Palouš

Personal details
- Born: 17 August 1961 (age 65) Prague, Czechoslovakia
- Party: Czech: Civic Democratic Party; EU: European Conservatives and Reformists Party
- Education: Univerzita Karlova
- Profession: Politician

Alexandr Vondra (Czech pronunciation: [ˈalɛksandr̩ ˈvondra]; born 17 August 1961) is a Czech politician and diplomat who has been a Member of the European Parliament (MEP) since 2019. He previously served as Minister of Foreign Affairs from 2006 to 2007 and Deputy Prime Minister for European Affairs between 2007 and 2009, both in cabinets of Prime Minister Mirek Topolánek, and then as Minister of Defence from 2010 to 2012 under prime minister Petr Nečas. He is also a former Senator for Litoměřice (2006–2012) and Czech Ambassador to the United States (1997–2001).

He was a candidate for the European Parliament seat in the 2019 election and received 29,536 preferential votes and was elected Member of the European Parliament. Vondra is a member of the Civic Democratic Party (ODS).

== Early life and education ==
Vondra was born on 17 August 1961 in Prague. He graduated in geography from Charles University in Prague in 1984, receiving a Doctor in Natural Sciences degree one year later. In the mid-1980s he was a dissident and Charter 77 signatory. After organizing a demonstration in January 1989, Vondra was imprisoned for two months. In November 1989, while the Velvet Revolution was underway, he co-founded the Civic Forum.

== Career ==
In 1990–1992, Vondra was foreign policy advisor to President Václav Havel. When Havel stepped down from his office during the dissolution of Czechoslovakia and at the same time an independent Czech foreign service was being formed, Vondra became the Czech Republic's First Deputy Minister of Foreign Affairs in August 1992, responsible i. a. for negotiating the division of Czechoslovak diplomacy. In 1996, he was a chief negotiator for the Czech-German Declaration on the Mutual Relations and their Future Development. In March 1997 Vondra left to become the Czech Ambassador to the United States, staying there until July 2001. From March 2001 to January 2003, Vondra was the Czech Government Commissioner responsible for the preparation of the 2002 Prague summit of NATO. From January to July 2003 Vondra was a Deputy Foreign Minister.

He became an ODS member only after his ministerial appointment and the victory in Senate elections in October 2006. He is generally perceived as pro-United States and wary of European integration, though less than ODS eurosceptic hardliners, and had good connections to Havel (his announced return to politics in spring 2006 was taken as a sign of ODS trying to appease the political centre).

Vondra was mentioned as a possible nominee to serve as European Commissioner in 2009.

He participated at the international conference European Conscience and Communism, which took place under his patronage at the Czech Senate in Prague in June 2008.

In November 2012, he decided to step down from politics due to the mounting pressure, his defeat in the Senate elections and criticism over one of the contracts during the 2009 Czech Presidency of the Council of the European Union.

In 2019, Vondra returned to politics when the Civic Democratic Party nominated him in European Parliament election. He was on 15th place on the party's list. He received 29,536 preferential votes and was elected.

Vondra then ran for the position of Vice-Chairman of ODS. He received 443 votes of 502 which was more than any other candidate and was elected.

== Teaching ==
After his 2012 exit from politics, Vondra served as director of the Prague Centre for Transatlantic Relations at the CEVRO Institute in Prague, as well as an instructor for both Bachelor and Master level courses at the university.

== Political views ==
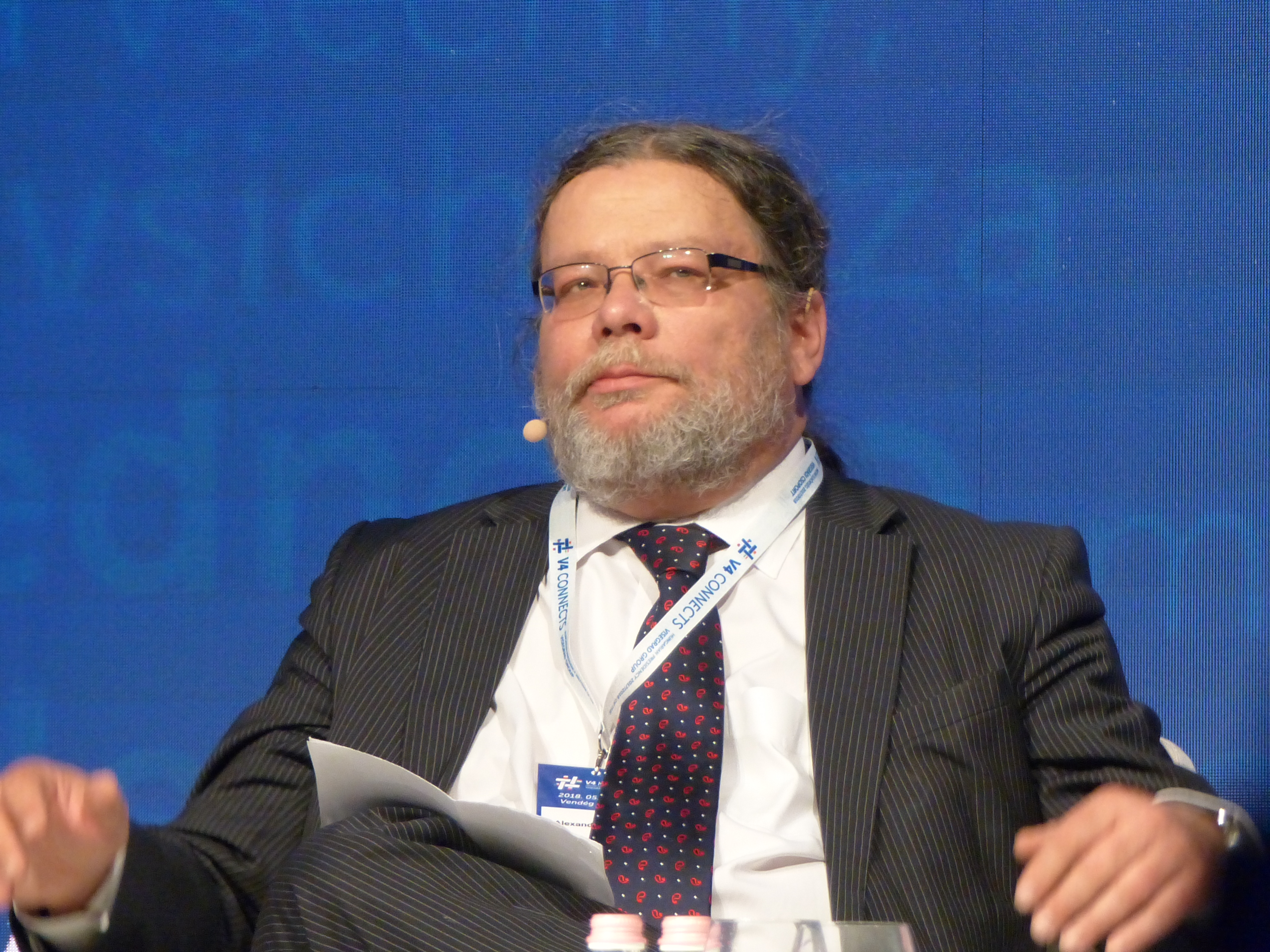
Alexandr Vondra in 2018

In 2014, he rejected Noam Chomsky's statements about dissidents in the East European communist countries, and remarked that "at the time when people like Havel were in Communist jails over their fight for freedom, Chomsky advocated Pol Pot's genocide in Cambodia from the Boston cafes" and he warned that if the world listens to "rubbish from these people" it will once again lead to concentration camps and gulags.

== Personal life ==
He is married and has three children with his wife Martina: Vojtěch (1991), Anna (1993) and Marie (1996). He has another child, Jáchym (1992), with Veronika Vrecionová.
