= University of South Bohemia in České Budějovice =

Public university in the Czech Republic

- Jihočeská univerzita v Českých Budějovicích
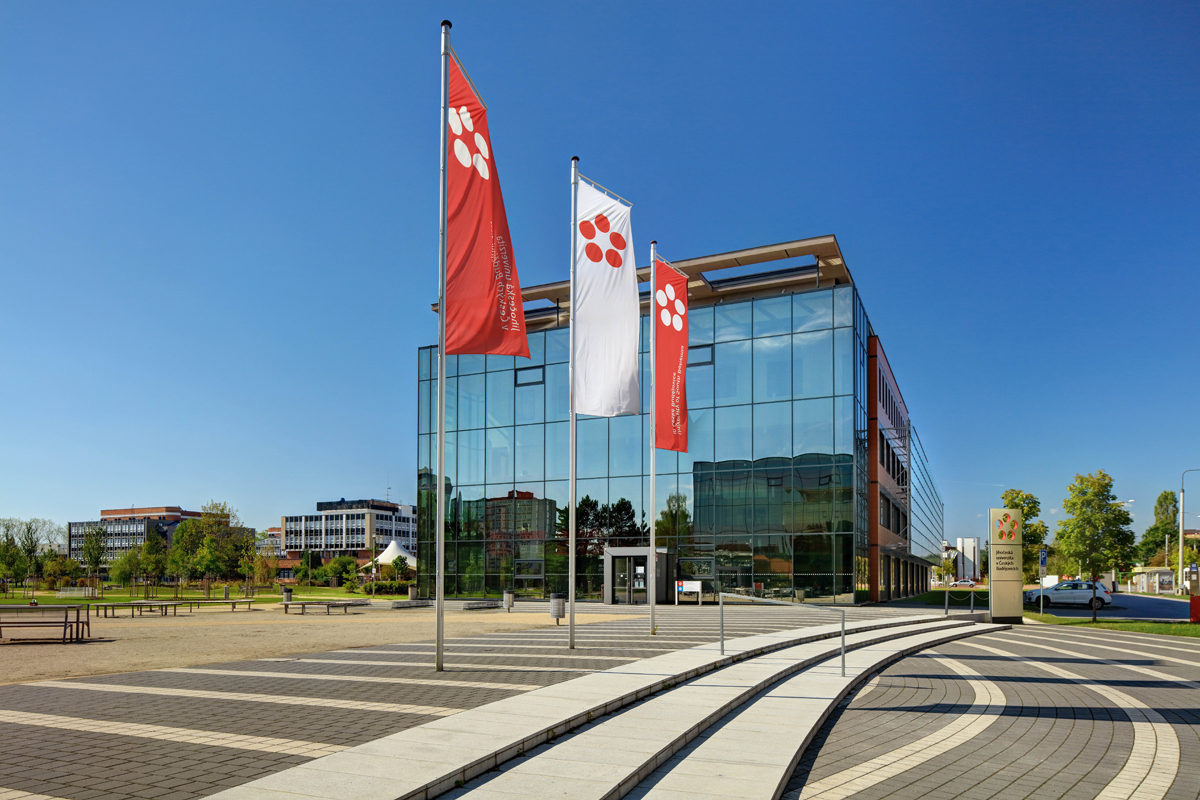
- Type: Public
- Established: 1991
- Rector: Prof. PhDr. Bohumil Jiroušek, Dr.
- Students: 9 000
- Location: České Budějovice, Czech Republic; 48°58′43.15″N 14°26′54.3″E
- Campus: Urban
- Website: www.jcu.cz

University rankings

Regional – Overall
- QS Emerging Europe and Central Asia: 145 (2022)

University of South Bohemia in České Budějovice (Czech: Jihočeská univerzita v Českých Budějovicích, Latin: Universitas Bohemiae Meridionalis Budovicensis, JU or JČU) is a public university located in the city of České Budějovice (with branch campuses in Tábor, Vodňany, Nové Hrady) in the Czech Republic. Established in 1991, it has more than 9,000 students in 200+ programmes including bachelor's and master's degrees as well as doctoral programmes and an academic staff 1,500. 592 students are currently enrolled in the university for their doctoral work.

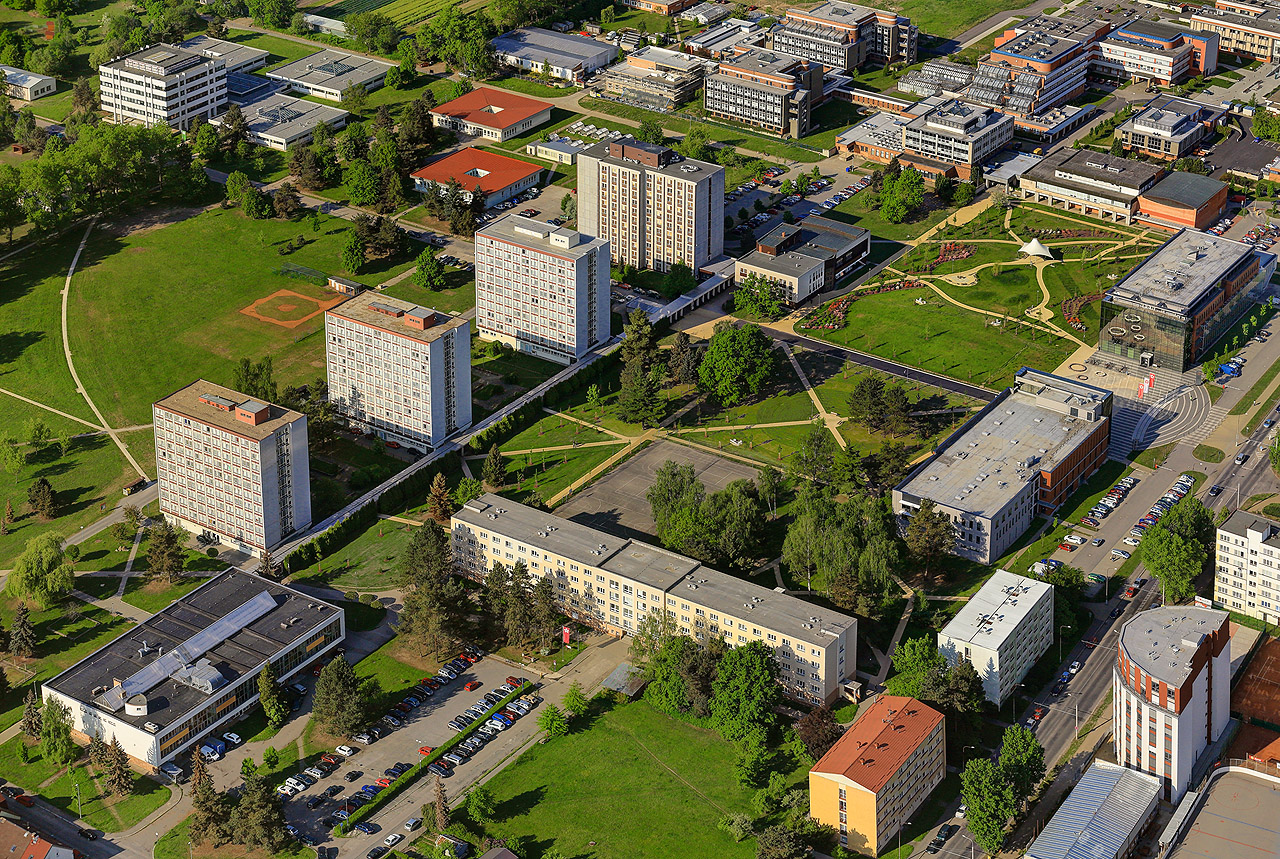
Aerial view of the main campus of the University of South Bohemia

== History ==
The university was established on September 28, 1991, by an Act of Parliament, on the basis of two unrelated and independent institutions located in the city of České Budějovice. These two institutions, the Pedagogical Faculty (established in 1948 as a branch of the Faculty of Education of Charles University which subsequently became an independent faculty) and the Faculty of Agriculture (established in 1960 as part of the Prague University of Agriculture) were merged to form the university. Three additional faculties, the Faculty of Biological Science, Faculty of Theology, and Faculty of Health and Social Studies, were founded by the university academic senate in November, 1991. The Faculty of Arts was founded in 2006 and the Faculty of Economics was added one year later. In 2009, the Faculty of Fisheries and Water Protection was established.

== Structure ==
The university consists of eight faculties, as follows:

Faculty of Arts: The faculty consists of eight academic departments.

Faculty of Agriculture and Technology: Established in 1960, it is one of the oldest faculties in the South Bohemia region and one of the founding members of the University of South Bohemia. Currently, this faculty has almost 2000 students studying their bachelor, master and doctoral programme.

Faculty of Economics: The Faculty of Economics consists of 8 departments. Its motto is "Effectively Together".

Faculty of Education: This faculty consists of 15 academic departments which are attended by almost 2,200 students and it has 156 university teachers and 92 non-teaching employees.

Faculty of Fisheries and Protection of Waters: This is the most recently established faculty (estd. 2009) of the university. It has 140 employers, 230 students and 50 doctoral candidates. More than half of the doctoral candidates are from abroad.

Faculty of Health and Social Sciences: Initially, it started as a part of the Faculty of Education, but starting in the next academic year, 1991/1992, it became a separate faculty. The faculty has total of seven academic departments with an official motto of "We teach people to help."

Faculty of Science: Established in 1991, the faculty is a successor of the Faculty of Biological Sciences (which was based on the Biology Centre of Academy of Sciences of the Czech Republic) and houses 12 academic departments. Though it originally offered courses only in the area of biological disciplines, since 2007 (when it became Faculty of Science) several other fields of science (chemistry, physics, mathematics, informatics) are incorporated in this faculty as well.

Faculty of Theology The theological faculty emphasizes the Christian ethical and social values. Since its inception in 1991, the diocesan bishop of České Budějovice has been by statute the moderator of the faculty.

== Rankings ==
University rankings

Global – Overall
- ARWU World: 901-1000
- QS World: 1001-1200
- USNWR Global: 941

In 2020, Academic Ranking of World Universities, also known as Shanghai Ranking, ranked the university in the 901-1000 band globally, and as the Czech Republic's seventh best university among the 70 ranked institutions of tertiary education from the country. In 2019, U.S. News & World Report ranked the University of South Bohemia at 941. According to U.S. News & World Report the university ranked 54 in the world for Marine Biology and Freshwater Aquaculture.

== University magazine ==
The university publishes a quarterly magazine (Journal) with 5000 copies. It contains news, interviews and reports from various faculties of the university.

== Student associations and activities ==
- Erasmus Student Network
- The Student Union of the University of South Bohemia
- SUD Theater
- Magazine Journal
- Student Radio K2

== Alumni ==
Notable alumni of the university include:

- Miluše Horská – Czech pedagogue and politician
- Hynek Kmoníček – Czech diplomat, Czech Republic ambassador to the United States
- Miroslav Lidinský – retired lieutenant at the Ministry of Defence; former chairman of the right-wing populist former political party Dawn - National Coalition

== See also ==
- List of universities in the Czech Republic
