= Bořek Šípek =

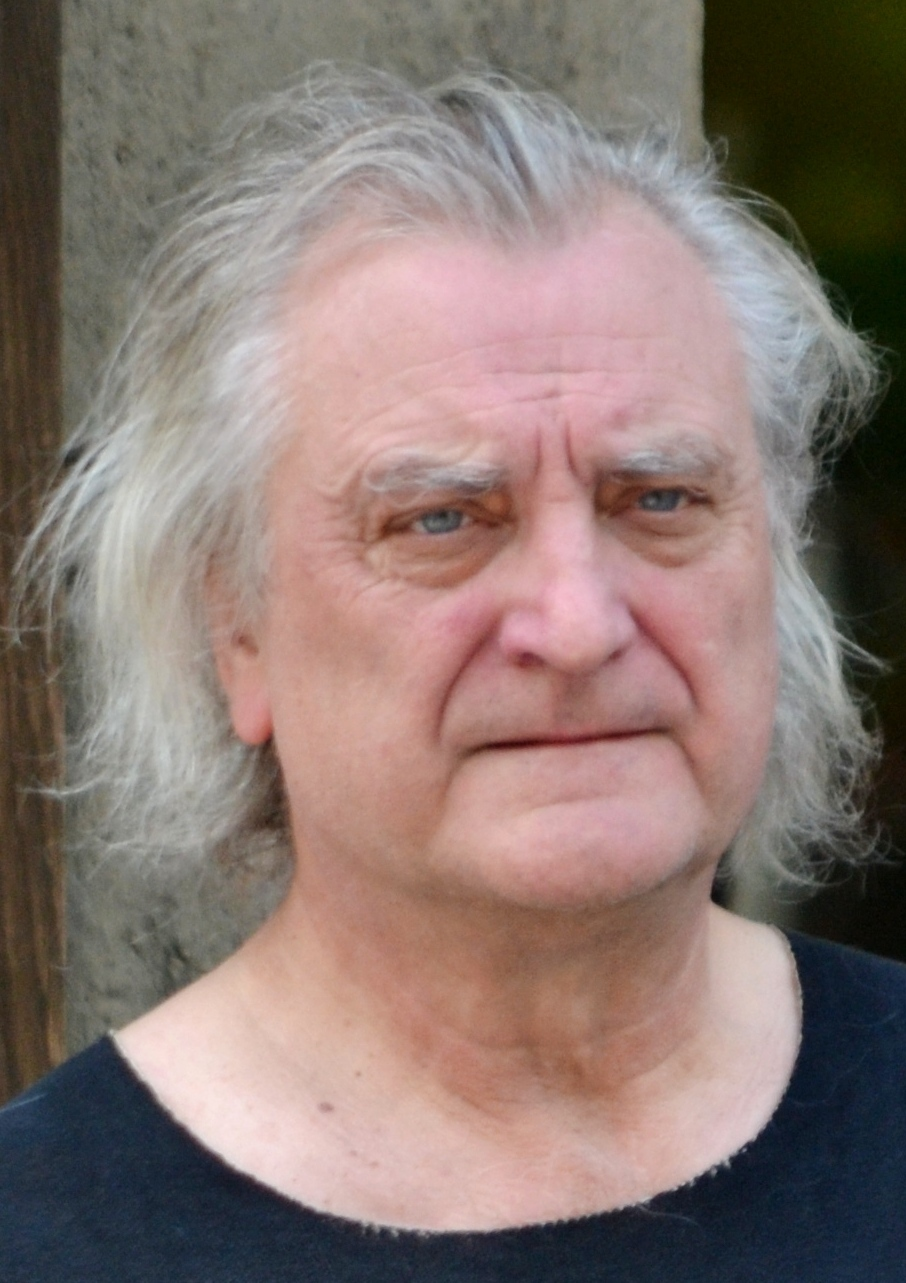
Bořek Šípek in 2014

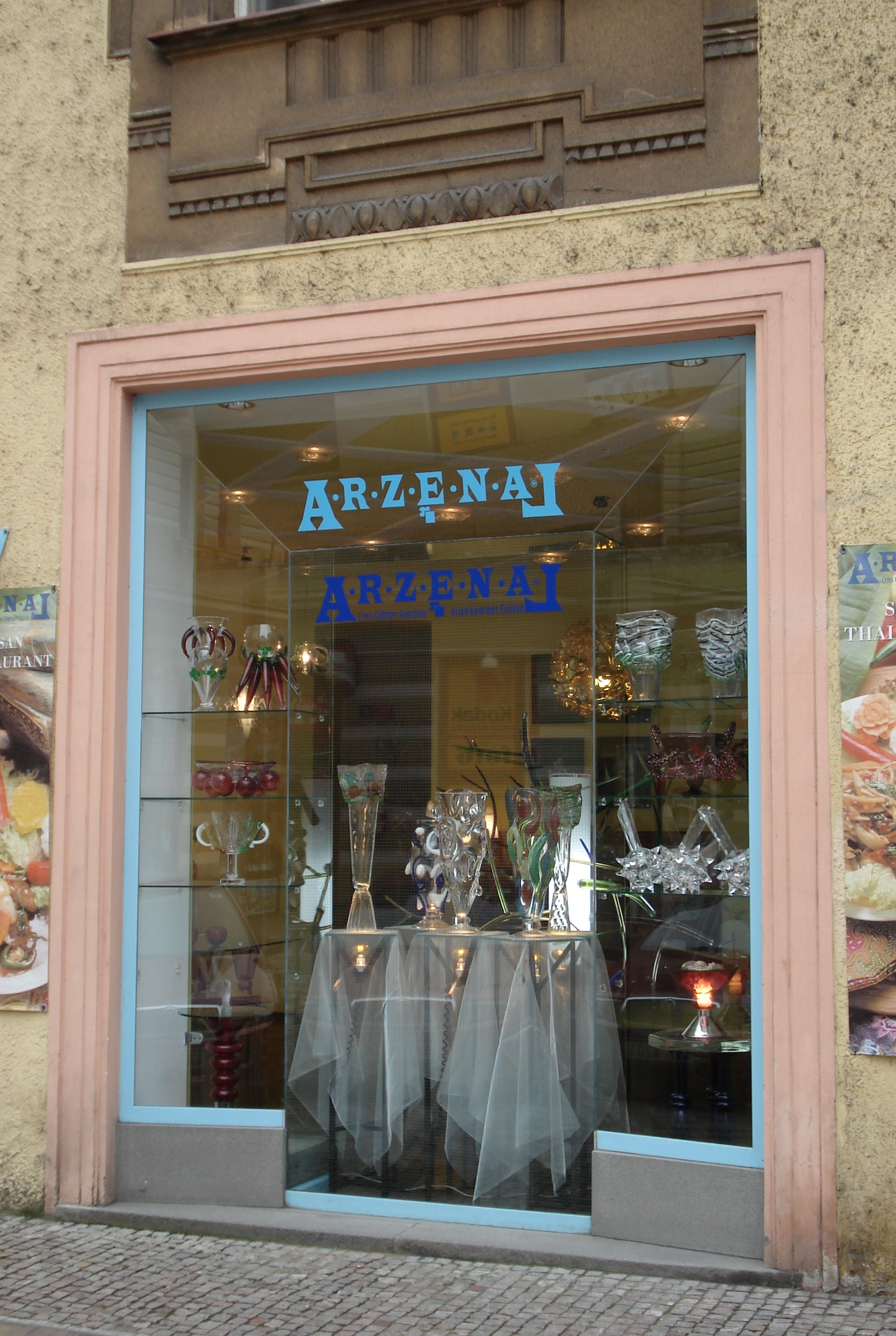
Arzenal, Bořek Šípek's shop in Prague

Bořek Šípek (14 June 1949 – 13 February 2016) was a Czech architect and designer.

== Biography ==
Born in Prague, he was renowned for his individual, unusual, colorful, and rich style. He experimented with unexpected and often opulent shapes.

Šípek is said to be the father of "neo-baroque". His architectural works and other designs are known worldwide, and his firm retains offices in Amsterdam, Prague, and Shanghai.

He was the architect of Prague Castle under the presidency of Václav Havel, and the designer of Havel's Place.

Šípek was a knight of the Ordre des Arts et des Lettres.

He had three sons, one of them with Leona Machálková.

Šípek died in 2016 at the age of 66 from cancer.
