= Miloslav Stašek =

Czech diplomat (1971)

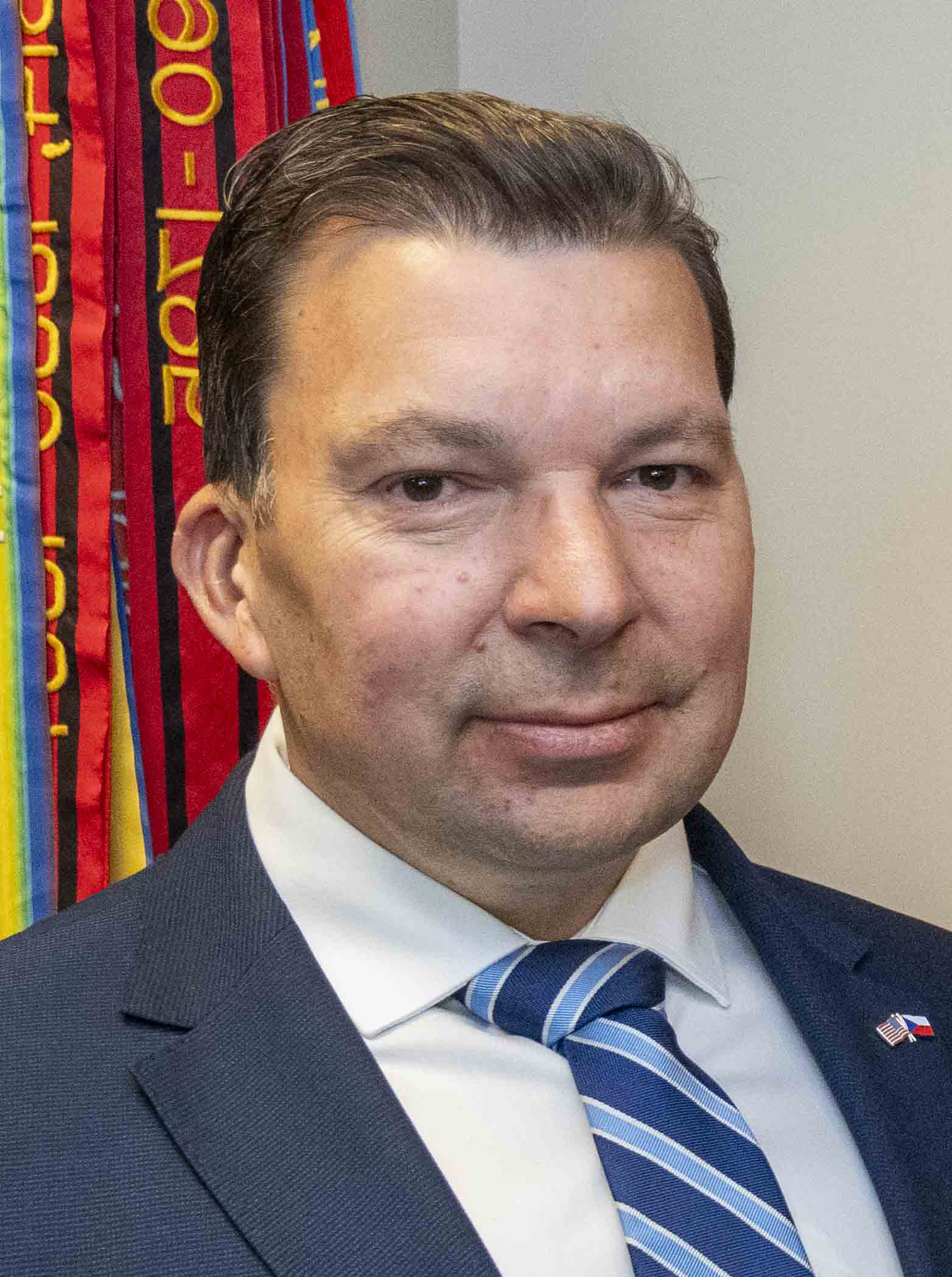
- Stašek in 2024

Ambassador of the Czech Republic to the United States
- Incumbent
- Assumed office 2 September 2022
- President: Petr Pavel
- Preceded by: Hynek Kmoníček

Personal details
- Born: November 11, 1971 (age 54) Plzeň, Czechoslovakia
- Education: Czech University of Life Sciences Prague

Miloslav Stašek (born November 11, 1971) is a Czech diplomat and the current ambassador of the Czech Republic to the United States.

== Early life and education ==
Born in the then-Czechoslovak city of Plzeň, he graduated from the Czech University of Life Sciences Prague.
