= Embassy of the Czech Republic, Washington, D.C. =

Embassy of the Czech Republic in Washington, D.C.
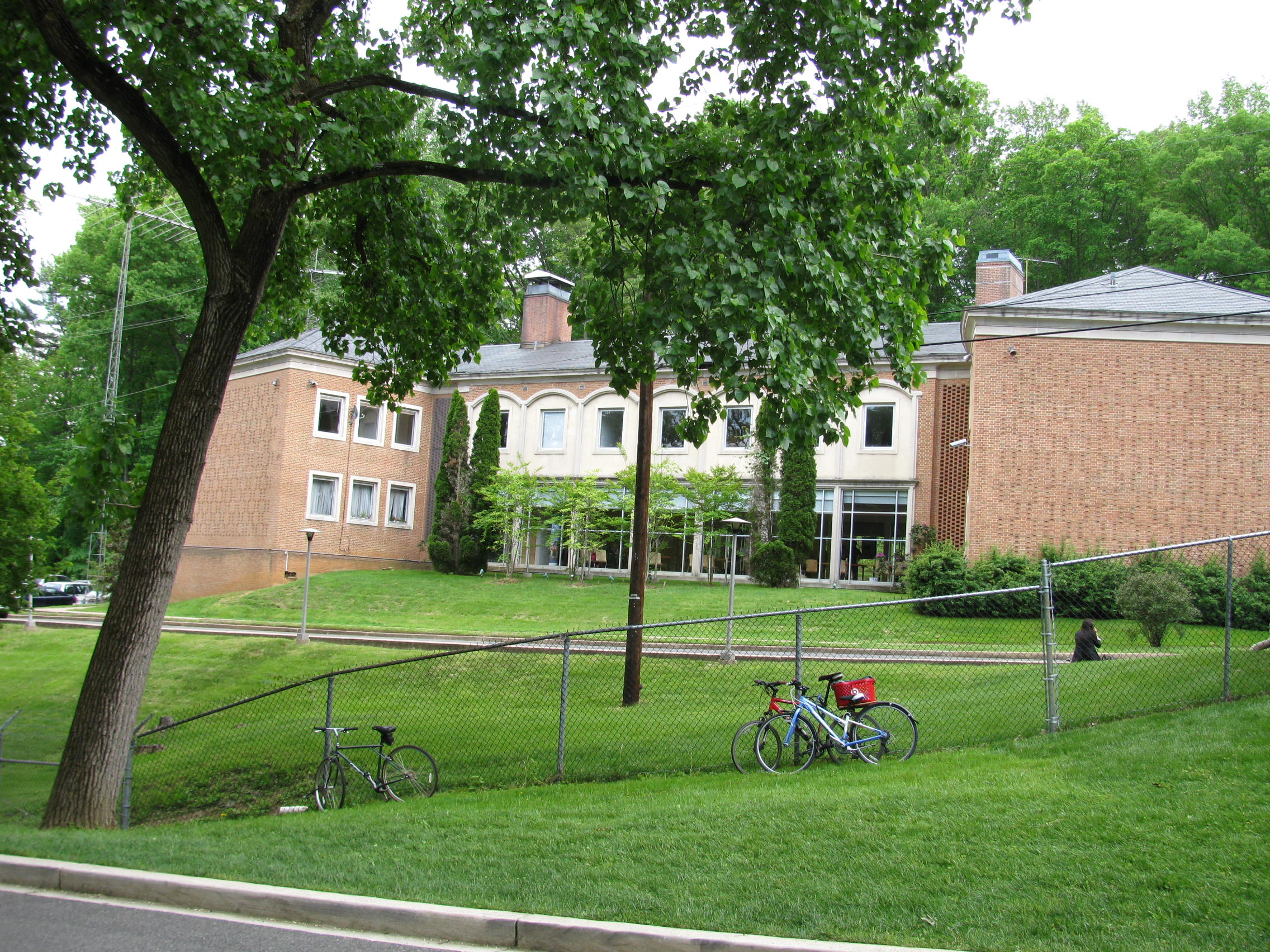
- Location: Washington, D.C.
- Address: 3900 Spring of Freedom St., N.W.
- Coordinates: 38°56′21″N 77°3′14″W
- Ambassador: Miloslav Stašek
- Website: http://www.mzv.cz/washington/

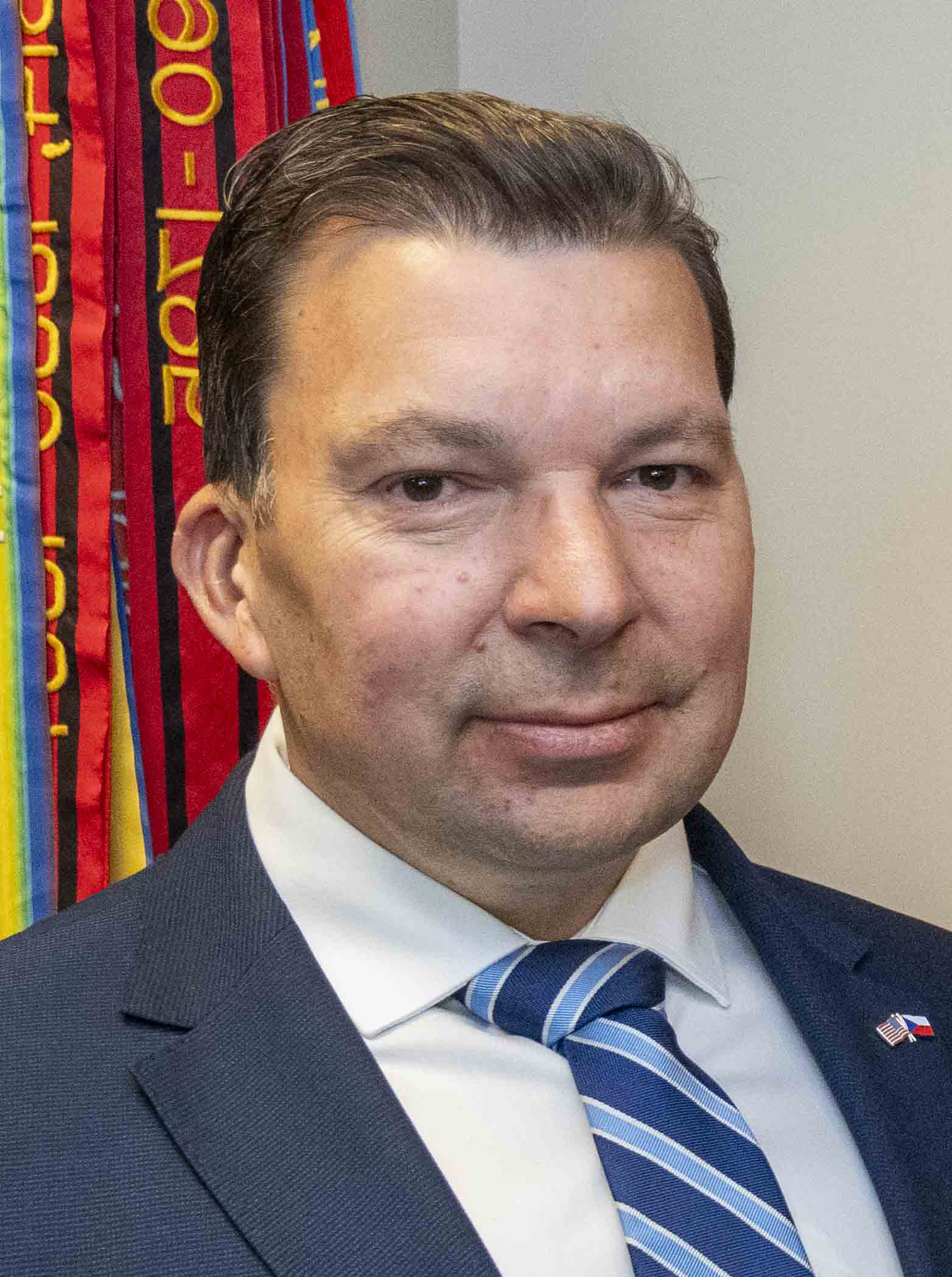
Miloslav Stašek in 2024

The Czech Embassy in Washington, D.C. is the Czech Republic's diplomatic mission to the United States. It is located at 3900 Spring of Freedom St., N.W. in Washington, D.C. The embassy also operates Consulates-General in New York City, Los Angeles, and Chicago.

Miloslav Stašek serves as the current Ambassador.
