= Egbert Lachaert =

Belgian politician and lawyer

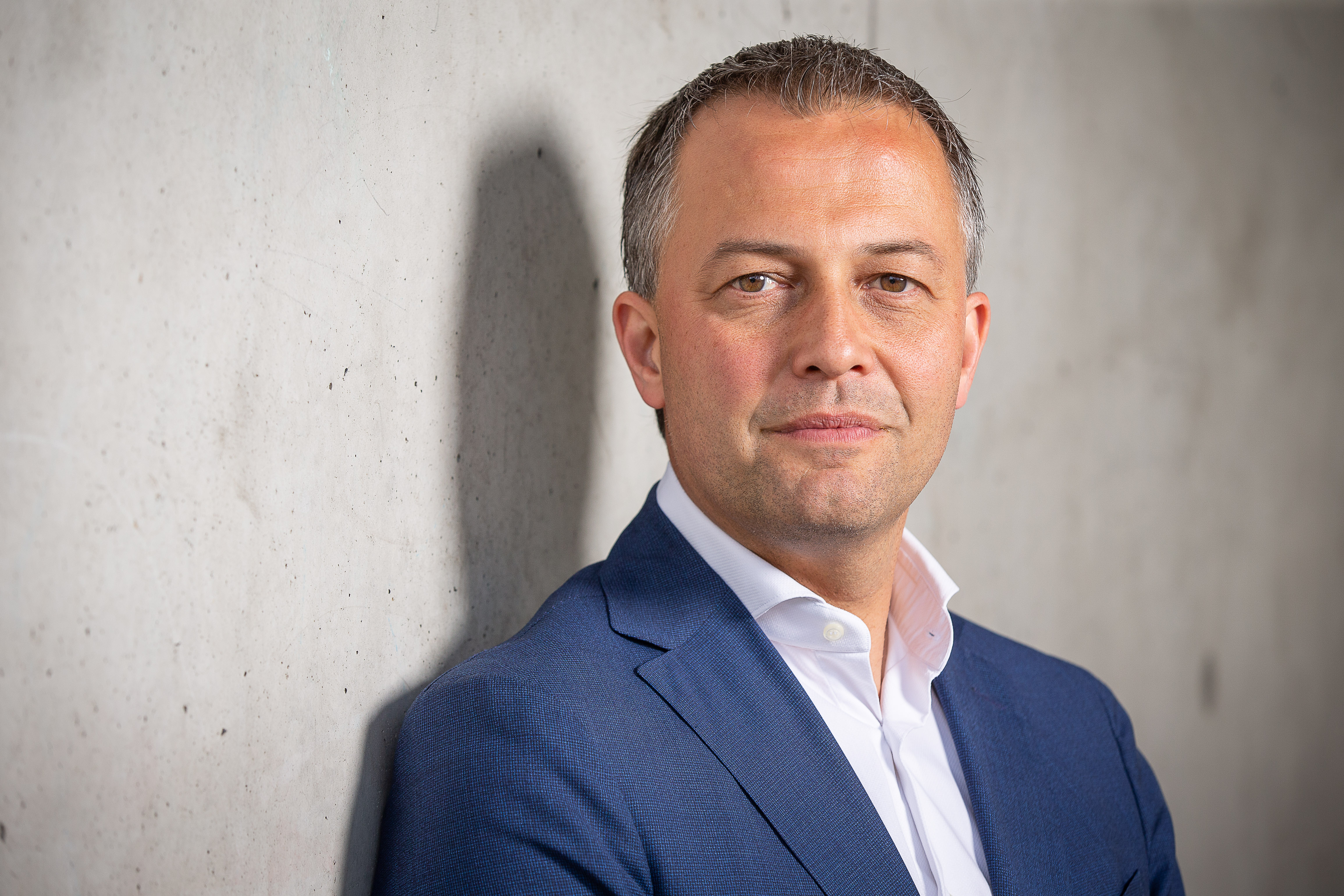

Leader of Open VLD
- In office 22 May 2020 – 2023
- Preceded by: Gwendolyn Rutten
- Succeeded by: Tom Ongena

Member of the Chamber of Representatives
- Incumbent
- Assumed office 2014

Member of the Flemish Parliament
- In office 25 September 2013 – 24 May 2014

Personal details
- Born: July 4, 1977 (age 49) Ghent, Belgium
- Citizenship: Belgian
- Party: Anders
- Education: Ghent University
- Occupation: Lawyer, politician

Egbert R. Lachaert (born 4 July 1977, in Ghent) is a Belgian lawyer, politician and was party chairman of the Open VLD.

== Biography ==
Lachaert was born in Ghent and is the son of Flemish politician Patrick Lachaert. He studied law at Ghent University where he was active in the Liberaal Vlaams Studentenverbond (LVSV) and served as national president of the LVSV from 1999 to 2000. After graduating he worked for the Flemish think-tank Liberales before training as a lawyer.

Lachaert became a member of the Flemish Parliament in 2013 to replace Filip Anthuenis who had resigned his seat. In 2014 Belgian federal election, Lachaert became an MP in the Chamber of Representatives for the East Flanders district and subsequently resigned his seat in the Flemish Parliament. He was re-elected in 2019 and became the Open-VLD's faction leader in the Chamber.

In 2020, he challenged Gwendolyn Rutten for leadership of the Open-VLD during a leadership contest and was subsequently elected as party chairman. As party leader, Lachaert has campaigned for more fiscal responsibility and to stop Belgium's phase out of nuclear power.

At the end of June 2023, Lachaert announced his departure as party chairman. His departure was related to the consecutive poor results for Open Vld in the polls.
