= Karel De Gucht =

Belgian politician

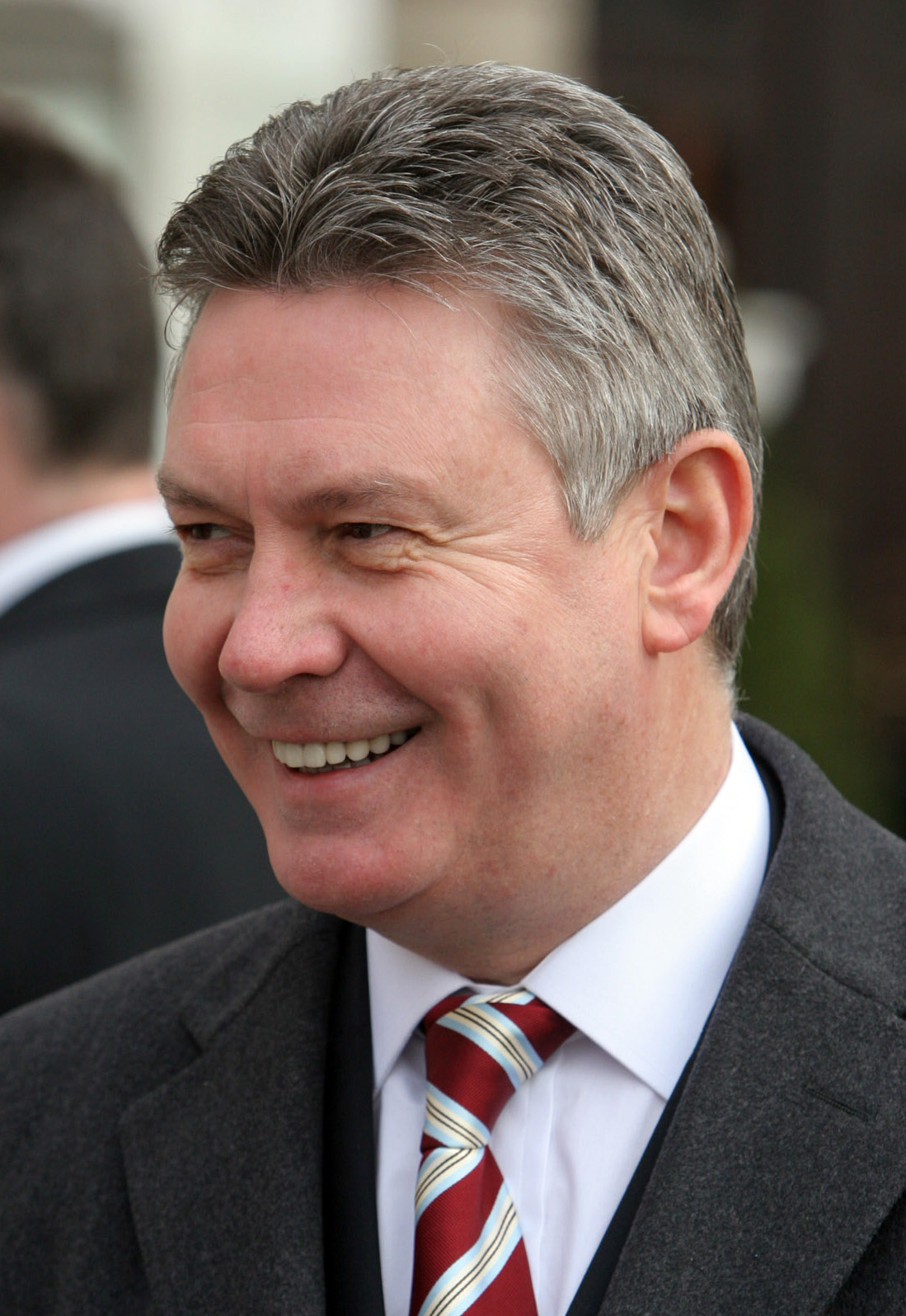
- De Gucht in 2006

European Commissioner for Trade
- In office 9 February 2010 – 1 November 2014
- President: José Manuel Barroso
- Preceded by: Benita Ferrero-Waldner (Trade and Neighbourhood Policy)
- Succeeded by: Cecilia Malmström

European Commissioner for Development and Humanitarian Aid
- In office 17 July 2009 – 9 February 2010
- President: José Manuel Barroso
- Preceded by: Louis Michel
- Succeeded by: Andris Piebalgs (Development); Kristalina Georgieva (International Cooperation, Humanitarian Aid and Crisis Response)

Minister of Foreign Affairs
- In office 18 July 2004 – 17 July 2009
- Prime Minister: Guy Verhofstadt; Yves Leterme; Herman Van Rompuy
- Preceded by: Louis Michel
- Succeeded by: Yves Leterme

Personal details
- Born: 27 January 1954 (age 72) Overmere, Belgium
- Party: Anders
- Spouse: Mireille Schreurs
- Children: Jean-Jacques; Frédéric
- Education: Free University of Brussels, Dutch
- Website: www.kareldegucht.be

Karel Lodewijk Georgette Emmerence De Gucht (Dutch pronunciation: [ˈkaːrəl də ˈɣʏxt]; born 27 January 1954) is a Belgian politician who was the European Commissioner for Trade from February 2010 until 31 October 2014. Previously, he served as Belgium's Minister of Foreign Affairs from 2004 to 2009 and as the European Commissioner for International Cooperation, Humanitarian Aid and Crisis Response from 2009 to 2010.

== Early life and education ==
De Gucht was born in Overmere, Belgium. He entered politics at a young age, and became president of the Flemish Liberal Students while studying at the Vrije Universiteit Brussel in Brussels. He graduated with a master's degree in Law and practised as a lawyer, mainly in commercial matters, at the bar of Ghent. He later taught European Law at his university.

== Political career ==
=== Member of the European Parliament, 1980–1994 ===
De Gucht became a member of the European Parliament in 1980 and fulfilled this mandate until 1994. In 1989 he was the rapporteur of a landmark Parliamentary Declaration on the Fundamental Rights, leading eventually to the Charter of Fundamental Rights of the European Union, which was later integrated as an essential part of the Treaty of Lisbon.

=== Career in national politics ===
De Gucht entered the Flemish Parliament after the elections of 1994 and moved to the Belgian Federal Parliament in 2003, where he remained until 2004. In 1999 he was elected party president of the Flemish liberal party Open Flemish Liberals and Democrats (now Anders). Although he was elected to the Federal Parliament in the general election on 18 May 2003 and to the European Parliament in the elections of June 2004, he occupied the first seat only very briefly and the second not at all.

He entered the Belgian government on 18 July 2004 as Belgian Minister of Foreign Affairs. He served as deputy prime minister in 2008–2009. He was Chairman-in-Office of the OSCE in 2006. He was a Member of the Security Council of the United Nations (2007–08) and Member of the European Council (2004–09).

=== European Commission, 2009–2014 ===
In July 2009 De Gucht was appointed as the Belgian European Commissioner, in succession of Louis Michel. Like his predecessor, he was in charge of Development and Humanitarian Aid, but from February 2010 onwards, he became Commissioner of Trade in the Barroso II Commission, until 31 October 2014.

He prepared and launched free trade negotiations with the United States, the so-called Transatlantic Trade and Investment Partnership (TTIP). He achieved important trade agreements, among others with South-Korea (2011), Colombia and Peru (2013), Central America, Singapore, Georgia, Moldavia and Ukraine (2014). In October 2014 he concluded CETA, the free trade agreement with Canada and the first ever agreement with a G7 member. He oversaw the start of trade negotiations with Japan and Vietnam, resumed talks with Mercosur and began investment agreement negotiations with China. He also concluded landmark economic partnership agreements with West Africa (ECOWAS), South Africa (SADC) and Eastern Africa (EAC), covering together 75% of African economy.

De Gucht performed his ultimate duty as a commissioner by signing in Nairobi on 31 October 2014 the agreement with the Eastern African Community (EAC), consisting of Burundi, Kenya, Rwanda, Tanzania and Uganda. He also played a key role in the conclusion of an Association Agreement between the European Union and Ukraine, which was a direct cause of Euromaidan and the Revolution of Dignity.

At the end of his mandate he enjoyed a strong reputation within the European Commission because of the progression in the trade portfolio during his mandate and because of his strong views on European policy questions. At the end of this mandate he decided to leave politics, except on the local level, where he will be the chairman of the local council.

== Controversies ==
De Gucht is well known for his outspoken views on different political issues.

On a trip to Africa in late 2004, De Gucht sparked a diplomatic controversy when he said that "there is a problem with the political class in the Congo" and questioned its ability to tackle corruption. De Gucht received a lot of informal support in diplomatic circles and media and refused to retract his statement. Subsequent news stories suggested his concerns were well-founded.

In November 2008 he was accused by an anonymous person and by the president of the extreme-right party Vlaams Belang of insider trading. The Ghent public prosecutor ultimately decided not to pursue an investigation in the matter stating that "from the investigations it appears that Mr. De Gucht has never abused his inside knowledge of the Fortis situation, more specifically the loss in the value of its shares", and closed the case.

Later in his career, De Gucht caused controversy by his active promotion of the Transatlantic Trade and Investment Partnership (TTIP). Some critics accused him of being over-enthusiastic about the TTIP, playing down potential risks to European small and medium-sized companies associated with the so-called Investor-state dispute settlement (ISDS) mechanism, and even of ignoring public concerns about the ISDS.

== Other activities ==
=== Corporate boards ===
- ArcelorMittal, Member of the Board of Directors (since 2016)
- CVC Capital Partners, Member of the European Advisory Board (since 2015)
- Proximus, Member of the Board of Directors

=== Non-profit organizations ===
- The Brussels School of Governance at the Vrije Universiteit Brussel (VUB), President

== Honours ==
- Poland: 1st class – Grand Cross of the Order of Merit of the Republic of Poland.

== Personal life ==
De Gucht is married to Mireille Schreurs, who is a judge. They live in Berlare and they have two sons, Frédéric and Jean-Jacques De Gucht.

== Publications ==
- Ketterijen – hoe overleven we onze tijd? ["Ketterijen – how do we survive our time?] Polis, 2017.
- Pluche – Over de banalisering van extreem rechts ["Pluche – On the banalisation of the extreme right"], Houtekiet, 2007.
- De toekomst is vrij : over het liberalisme in de 21ste eeuw ["The future is free – On liberalism in the 21st century"], Houtekiet, 2002.
- Het einde der pilaren : een Toscaans gesprek ["The end of religious and philosophical pillars in society – Tuscany conversations"]- with MEP Johan Van Hecke, Houtekiet, 2001.
- Er zijn geen eilanden meer: over de democratie, vrijheid en de mensrechten ["No man is an island – On democracy, liberty and human rights"], with Dirk Sterckx MEP, Houtekiet, 1999.
- Time and tide wait for no man: the changing European geopolitical landscape, Praeger Publishers, 1991.

Political offices
Preceded by Louis Michel	Minister of Foreign Affairs; 2004–2009	Succeeded by Yves Leterme
Preceded by Louis Michel	Belgian European Commissioner; 2009–2014	Succeeded by Marianne Thyssen
Preceded by Louis Michel	European Commissioner for Development and Humanitarian Aid; 2009–2010	Succeeded by Andris Piebalgs as European Commissioner for Development
Preceded by Louis Michel	European Commissioner for Development and Humanitarian Aid; 2009–2010	Succeeded by Kristalina Georgieva as European Commissioner for International Cooperation, Humanitarian Aid and Crisis Response
Preceded by Peter Mandelson; Catherine Ashton; Benita Ferrero-Waldner	European Commissioner for Trade; 2010–2014	Succeeded by Cecilia Malmström
