= Van der Straeten =

Van der Straeten is a Dutch or Flemish surname. Notable people with the surname include:

- Jan Baptist van der Straeten (Antwerp before 1671–1731), a Flemish painter
- Jooris van der Straeten (1638–1685), a Flemish portrait and history painter
- Tinne Van der Straeten (born 1 April 1978), a Flemish politician
- Yolande Van Der Straeten (born 8 July 1966), a Belgian swimmer
- Yves Van Der Straeten (born 18 January 1971 in Berlare, Belgium), a retired Belgian professional soccer player
