= Liberales =

Belgian think tank

The Cuneiform symbol ama-gi meaning 'freedom' used by some libertarians, is also the logo of the Liberales thinktank.

Liberales is an independent liberal think tank (some tend to call Liberales left-liberal), located in Ghent, Flanders, Belgium. The organization promotes progressive liberalism and supports individual freedom, justice, a certain degree of self-government and human rights. It also supports responsibility, civil liberties, and solidarity. Liberales opposes conservatism, fascism, communism, libertarianism, and religious intolerance.

Lawrence Vanhove is the president and spokesman of the organization. Other well-known members of the board are Mathias De Clercq, the mayor of Ghent and Dirk Verhofstadt, the brother of the former liberal Belgian Prime Minister Guy Verhofstadt.

Liberales is recognized as an influential liberal think tank in Flanders, but has no structural link with the Flemish liberal party VLD.

== Oxford Manifesto ==
On 17 December 2007, at De Markten in Brussels, Liberales presented a new version of the Oxford Manifesto.

== See also ==
- Contributions to liberal theory
- Green liberalism
- Liberaal Vlaams Verbond (LVV)
- Liberal International
- Liberalism in Belgium
- Oxford Manifesto
- Karl Popper
- John Rawls
- Social liberalism
