= War Crimes Law (Belgium) =

National war crimes law including universal jurisdiction

Belgium's War Crimes Law invokes the concept of universal jurisdiction to allow anyone to bring war crime charges in Belgian courts, regardless of where the alleged crimes have taken place.

Note that this is a Belgian law and is different from the International Criminal Court, which is a treaty body to try war crimes, and also different from the International Court of Justice, which is a U.N. body to settle disputes between countries. Both of these bodies reside in nearby The Hague, Netherlands, although some have said that American Servicemen's Protection Act passed by the United States was also directed against the War Crimes Law.

== Background ==
The law took effect in 1993 and was expanded the following year after 10 Belgian soldiers were killed in Rwanda.

The law reached prominence after the Rwandan genocide. According to the Washington Post, the process of prosecution of Rwandans in Belgium for crimes committed in the violence were set in motion by Martine Beckers, a Brussels resident, whose sister Claire called her to tell her of being attacked by soldiers, who soon after killed her, her family, and 10 other villagers who were unable to reach a United Nations peacekeepers' compound.

== Universal jurisdiction ==
Countries have long claimed jurisdiction over nationals of other countries or suits against countries themselves in matters Civil or criminal where those foreign nationals are alleged to have committed crimes against the complaining country's nationals, or have committed crimes in the complaining country.

What made this Belgian law controversial was that it afforded the right to anyone to submit a war crime for prosecution in Belgian courts that occurred anywhere in the world, whether on Belgian territory, and whether a Belgian national was involved as either criminal or victim. This concept called universal jurisdiction, or universal competence, was recently used in Germany to indict high-ranking US officials for their involvement in prisoner abuse in the war on terror under the command responsibility.

== Problems with implementation of the law ==
The law soon ran into trouble when a number of parties worldwide filed cases criticized as politically motivated against leaders of various nations.

- Prime Minister Ariel Sharon was accused of involvement in the 1982 Sabra and Shatila massacre in Lebanon, conducted by a Christian militia;
- Israelis filed a case against Yasser Arafat on grounds of responsibility for terrorist activity;
- In 2003, Iraqi victims of a 1991 Baghdad bombing pressed charges against George H. W. Bush, Colin Powell, and Dick Cheney.

American officials Norman Schwarzkopf and Tommy Franks were also accused. Cases had also been filed against the leaders of many other countries, such as Iraq and Cuba's Fidel Castro. The paperwork backing several of these filings was very limited, consisting out of a single fax or several pages.

Critics assailed the law as an attempt to circumvent the sovereignty of other states and become a venue for partisan show trials of propaganda value but no legal consequence. Proponents respond by arguing that universal jurisdiction is often the only recourse victims of war crimes have, and that under the UN Charter countries are already obliged to prosecute those involved in war crimes.

In an effort by the United States to pressure Belgium, United States Secretary of Defense Donald Rumsfeld threatened to remove the NATO Headquarters from Brussels unless the Law was changed.

== Most cases dropped ==
On 12 July 2003, the incoming government of Prime Minister Guy Verhofstadt announced that scrapping this law would be among the first acts carried out.

In September of that year, the Belgian Court of Cassation threw out the cases against the former President Bush and other US officials, as well as Israelis.

== Modified law and criticism ==
Six human rights groups (Amnesty International Belgium, both the Dutch-speaking Human Rights League and the French-speaking Human Rights League of Belgium, the International Federation for Human Rights, Avocats Sans Frontières (Lawyers Without Borders) and Human Rights Watch) called that loss of the universal jurisdiction component "a step backwards in the global fight against the worst atrocities."

Human Rights Watch outlined the reduced scope of the law:

Belgian courts will only have jurisdiction over international crimes if the accused is Belgian or has his primary residence in Belgium; if the victim is Belgian or has lived in Belgium for at least three years at the time the crimes were committed; or if Belgium is required by treaty to exercise jurisdiction over the case. The new law also considerably reduces victims' ability to obtain direct access to the courts – unless the accused is Belgian or has his primary residence in Belgium, the decision whether to proceed with any complaint rests entirely with the state prosecutor.

== Court of Arbitration ==
On 21 June 2006, the Constitutional Court of Belgium (called the Court of Arbitration at the time) annulled parts of the modified law which came in place of the Belgian War Crimes Law.
