= Frédéric De Gucht =

Belgian politician (born 1981)

Leader of Anders
- Incumbent
- Assumed office 17 October 2025
- Preceded by: Eva De Bleeker

Personal details
- Born: 29 April 1981 (age 45)
- Party: Anders
- Parent: Karel De Gucht (father)
- Relatives: Jean-Jacques De Gucht (brother)

Frédéric Charles Louis Leon De Gucht (born 20 April 1981) is a Belgian politician serving as leader of Anders since 2025. From 2023 to 2025, he served as leader of the party in Brussels. From 2014 to 2025, he served as CEO of Sprimoglass. He is the son of Karel De Gucht and the brother of Jean-Jacques De Gucht.
