= Anders (political party) =

Political party from Belgium

Different Anders
- President: Frédéric De Gucht
- Vice President: Eva De Bleeker
- Founded: 1992; 34 years ago (VLD); 2007; 19 years ago (Open Vld); January 19, 2026; 8 months ago (Anders)
- Merger of: VLD, LA, Vivant (Open Vld)
- Preceded by: Party for Freedom and Progress
- Headquarters: Melsensstraat 34 Brussels
- Membership (2018): ▼60,000
- Ideology: Liberalism (Belgian); Pro-Europeanism
- Political position: Centre-right
- Regional affiliation: Liberal Group
- European affiliation: Alliance of Liberals and Democrats for Europe
- European Parliament group: Renew Europe
- International affiliation: Liberal International
- Francophone counterpart: Reformist Movement
- Germanophone counterpart: Perspectives. Freedom. Progress.
- Colours: Blue
- Chamber of Representatives: 7 / 87 (8%) (Flemish seats)
- Senate: 5 / 35 (14%) (Flemish seats)
- Flemish Parliament: 9 / 124
- Brussels Parliament: 2 / 17 (Flemish seats)
- European Parliament: 1 / 22 (5%) (Flemish seats)
- Flemish Provincial Councils: 13 / 175
- Benelux Parliament: 2 / 21

Website
- anders.be

Anders (Dutch: [ˈɑndərs], lit. ''Different''), formerly known as the Open Flemish Liberals and Democrats (Dutch: Open Vlaamse Liberalen en Democraten, [ˈoːpə(ɱ) ˈvlaːmsə libəˈraːlən ɛn deːmoːˈkraːtə(n), -lə ʔɛn -], Open VLD), is a Flemish liberal political party in Belgium. Politically liberal, the party has been described as centre-right, and has smaller factions within the party that have conservative liberal, as well as social liberal views. The party is a member of the Liberal Group, Renew Europe, and Liberal International. On 19 January 2026, its current name was adopted.

The party was created in 1992 from the former bilingual Party for Freedom and Progress (PVV) and politicians from other parties after Belgium was reconstituted as a federal state based on language, with the French-speaking faction forming the Reformist Movement (MR) in Wallonia. The party led the government for three cabinets under Guy Verhofstadt from 1999 until March 2008. Open VLD then formed the federal government (the "Swedish government") with the New Flemish Alliance (N-VA), Christian Democratic and Flemish (CD&V), and MR.

In the Flemish Parliament, the VLD formed a coalition government with sp.a-Spirit and CD&V from after the 2004 Belgian regional elections until the 2009 Belgian regional elections. Open Vld was a member of the Leterme I Government formed on 22 March 2008, the Van Rompuy I Government formed on 2 January 2009, the Leterme II Government formed on 24 November 2009, and the Di Rupo Government formed on 6 December 2011.

Ideologically, Open VLD started as an economically liberal, in the mold of Thatcherism, which mirrored some of the original ideology of the PVV. The VLD rapidly became more centrist and gave up much of its free-market approach, partly under the influence of Verhofstadt's political scientist brother Dirk Verhofstadt. The VLD continued to contain conservative-libertarian and classical liberal wings with ties to think-tanks like Nova Civitas. Party chairman Bart Somers called in November 2006 for a "revolution" within the party, saying that "a liberal party", like the VLD, "can be only progressive and social".

From 2000 to 2004, during the second period of its participation in the Belgian federal government and under Belgian Prime Minister Verhofstadt, the VLD allegedly lost most of its ideological appeal. Several of its thinkers such as former member and Nova Civitas president Boudewijn Bouckaert heavily criticized the party. Many others, particularly from the party's conservative and Flemish autonomist wing, resented the priority it placed on the "Belgian compromise", which enabled the Socialist Party (PS) of the French Community of Belgium to gain a dominant position in the formulation of Belgian federal government policy.

In 2004, the VLD teamed up with the minority social-liberal party Vivant for both the Flemish and European elections. VLD-Vivant lost the elections to arch rivals CD&V and the Flemish Bloc. The VLD fell from second to third place among the Flemish political parties, slipping narrowly behind the sp.a-Spirit cartel. Internal feuds, the support for electoral rights for immigrants, and an unsuccessful economic policy were seen as the main reasons for its election defeat. From 2007, the party kept having electoral difficulties, first due to competition from split-off List Dedecker and after 2010 from the liberal-conservative Flemish nationalist party N-VA.

== History ==
The VLD has its origins in the Party for Freedom and Progress (which in turn was a successor to the Liberal Party), a bilingual party which stood in both the Flemish and Walloon regions of Belgium. As such the liberal party is the oldest political party of Belgium. In 1846, Walthère Frère-Orban succeeded in creating a political program which could unite several liberal groups into one party. Before 1960, the Liberal Party of Belgium was barely organised. The school pact of 1958, as a result of which the most important argument for the traditional anti-clericalism was removed, gave the necessary impetus for a thorough renewal. During the liberal party congress of 1961, the Liberal Party was reformed into the bilingual Party for Freedom and Progress (PVV-PLP), and Omer Vanaudenhove became the chairman of the new party. The new liberal party, which struggled with an anti-clerical image, opened for believers, but was not too concerned about the situation of workers and primarily defended the interests of employers. It is a central principle of Classical Liberalism that employers and employees do not have opposed long term interests.

In the late 1960s and the early 1970s, the tensions between the different communities in Belgium rose and there were disagreements within the liberal movement as well. In 1972, the unitary PVV-PLP was split into separate a Flemish and a Francophone parties. On Flemish side, under the guidance of Frans Grootjans, Herman Vanderpoorten and Willy De Clercq, the PVV was created, on Walloon side Milou Jeunehomme became the head of the PLP and Brussels got its own but totally disintegrated liberal party landscape. Willy De Clercq became the first chairman of the independent Party of Freedom and Progress (Dutch: Partij voor Vrijheid en Vooruitgang, PVV). De Clercq, together with Frans Grootjans and Herman Vanderpoorten, set out the lines for the new party. This reform was coupled an Ethical Congress, on which the PVV adopted progressive and tolerant stances regarding abortion, euthanasia, adultery, homosexuality, and gender equality.

In 1982, the 29-year-old reformer Guy Verhofstadt became the chairman of the party, and even was Deputy Prime Minister and Minister of Budget from 1986 to 1988. Annemie Neyts succeeded him as chairman, becoming the first female party chairman. In 1989, Verhofstadt once more became the chairman of the PVV, after his party had been condemned to the opposition by the Christian People's Party (CVP) in 1987. In 1992, the PVV was reformed into the Flemish Liberals and Democrats (Vlaamse Liberalen en Democraten, VLD) under the impulse of Verhofstadt. Although the VLD was the successor of the PVV, many politicians with democratic nationalist or socialist roots joined the new party. Notable examples are Jaak Gabriëls, then-president of the Flemish People's Union, and Hugo Coveliers. From the early 1990s, the VLD advanced in every election, only to get in government following the 1999 Belgian federal election when the VLD became the largest party. Verhofstadt became Prime Minister of Belgium and Patrick Dewael became Minister-President of Flanders. They were both at the head of a coalition of liberals, social democrats, and greens.

=== 2007 elections ===
The logo for the party when it was known as Open VLD.

Before the 2007 general election, the VLD participated in a cartel with Vivant and Liberal Appeal. In February 2007, it decided to cease the cartel and start operating under the name Open VLD. On 10 June 2007, Open VLD won 18 out of 150 seats in the Chamber of Representatives and five out of 40 seats in the Senate.

=== 2010 elections ===
In the 2010 general election, Open VLD won 13 out of 150 seats in the Chamber of Representatives. After the long government formation process, on 6 December 2011 the Di Rupo Government was formed, with Open VLD one of the six constituent parties.

=== 2014 elections ===
The party saw a modest increase in support in the 2014 general election, winning 14 out of 150 seats in the Chamber of Representatives. Following the elections, the party was part of a five-party coalition (Michel I Government) that saw Charles Michel become Prime Minister.

=== 2019 elections ===
The 2019 general election saw a small decrease in support for Open VLD, with the party winning 12 out of 150 seats in the Chamber of Representatives. This election led to a prolonged government negotiation, which ultimately resulted in Open VLD member Alexander De Croo becoming Prime Minister over a year after the election took place. The De Croo Government was a seven-party coalition with support coming from the moderate right, social democrats, and greens in both the Flemish and Francophone communities.

=== 2024 elections ===
The 2024 general election saw the worst result in history for Open VLD, being reduced to eight seats in the Chamber of Representatives. De Croo resigned as Prime Minister in the aftermath, and in 2025 the De Wever government was formed excluding Open VLD for the first time since the 1995 Belgian federal election.

The party adopted its current name in January 2026, dropping the Vlaamse Liberalen en Democraten for the first time since its founding.

== Ideology and support ==
At its inception, the Open VLD was a classical liberal and somewhat right-libertarian party with support for free-markets and deregulation. Former party leader Guy Verhofstadt was compared to Margaret Thatcher in his beliefs during his time as party chairman. In the 1990s, the party switched from a right-libertarian to a more socially liberal position under Bart Somers. Some of the party's ideological influences have been Karl Popper, John Stuart Mill, Thomas Paine, Amartya Sen, and Martha Nussbaum. The party also contained members from both social democratic and Flemish nationalists with liberal-conservative backgrounds who influenced the VLD's course, such as former Volksunie leader Jaak Gabriëls and Hugo Coveliers falling into the latter camp. Others had ties to the conservative-libertarian organization Nova Civitas, and were open to working with the Vlaams Blok and later Vlaams Belang party, although this was strongly opposed by the party leadership as a whole.

The Open VLD retains an economically liberal position by supporting lower taxes and private property ownership while also closing tax loopholes. It supports a Canadian model of migration and for a more inclusive society towards immigrants, but claims not to endorse open borders and wants quicker deportation of illegal immigrants. It also retains a socially liberal stance on matters such as same-sex marriage, LGBT rights, and introducing a third gender option on official documents, but also believes the government should not interfere with matters related to sexuality.

For a period, the party was considered the main centre-right rival to the Christian Democratic CD&V in the Flemish region and saw its highest period of support in the late 1990s and early 2000s. However, the emergence of the Flemish nationalist N-VA party and the LDD drew some of the party's conservative leaning voters away and contributed to a decline in votes. Ideological disputes also caused some of the party's more conservative and traditionalist libertarian wing such as Boudewijn Bouckaert, Jean-Marie Dedecker and Hugo Coveliers to leave the party. Dedecker later founded the LDD and Coveliers VLOTT while others joined the N-VA. In 2024, Open VLD (along with Reformist Movement) blocked Belgium from recognizing the State of Palestine.

== Representation in EU institutions ==
The party is fairly pro-European, and sits in the Renew Europe group with two MEPs. Then-Prime Minister Verhofstadt (VLD) was rejected as a candidate for the presidency of the European Commission in June 2004. In the European Committee of the Regions, Open VLD sits in the Renew Europe CoR group, with one alternate members for the 2025-2030 mandate. Jean-Luc Vanraes is Coordinator in the CIVEX Commission.

== Members holding notable public offices ==
=== European politics ===
European Parliament
| Name | Committees |
|---|---|
| Guy Verhofstadt | Constitutional Affairs |
| Hilde Vautmans | Foreign Affairs; Women's Rights and Gender Equality |

=== Federal politics ===
Chamber of Representatives
| Name | Notes | Name | Notes |
|---|---|---|---|
| (Flemish Brabant) Maggie De Block | Faction leader | (Flemish Brabant) Goedele Liekens | |
| (Flemish Brabant) Tim Vandenput | Mayor of Hoeilaart | (Limburg (Belgium)) Patrick Dewael | Mayor of Tongeren |
| (Antwerp Province) Christian Leysen | | (Antwerp Province) Marianne Verhaert | |
| (East Flanders) Egbert Lachaert | Party President | (East Flanders) Tania De Jonge | |
| (East Flanders) Katja Gabriëls | Mayor of Berlare | (East Flanders) Robby De Caluwé | Mayor of Moerbeke |
| (West Flanders) Jasper Pillen | | (West Flanders) Kathleen Verhelst | |

Senate
| Type | Name | Notes |
|---|---|---|
| Co-opted Senator | (Flemish Brabant) Rik Daems | Faction leader |
| Community Senator | (Brussels) Els Ampe | |
| Community Senator | (Antwerp Province) Tom Ongena | |
| Community Senator | (Limburg (Belgium)) Steven Coenegrachts | |
| Community Senator | (East Flanders) Stephanie D'Hose | President of the Senate |

Belgian Federal De Croo Government
| Public Office | Name | Function |
|---|---|---|
| Prime Minister | Alexander De Croo | |
| Deputy Prime Minister | Vincent Van Quickenborne | Justice and the North Sea |
| Secretary of State | Eva de Bleeker | Budget and Consumer Protection |

=== Regional politics ===
Flemish Parliament
| Name | Notes | Name | Notes |
|---|---|---|---|
| (Antwerp Province) Willem-Frederik Schiltz | Fraction Leader | (Antwerp Province) Tom Ongena | Community Senator |
| (Flemish Brabant) Gwendolyn Rutten | Former Party President mayor of Aarschot | (Flemish Brabant) Gwenny De Vroe | |
| (Flemish Brabant) Maurits Vande Reyde | | (Brussels) Els Ampe | Community Senator |
| (Limburg (Belgium)) Steven Coenegrachts | Community Senator | (Limburg (Belgium)) Marino Keulen | Mayor of Lanaken |
| (East Flanders) Stephanie D'Hose | President of the Senate | (East Flanders) Jean-Jacques De Gucht | Son of Karel De Gucht |
| (East Flanders) Freya Saeys | | (East Flanders) Bart Van Hulle | |
| (West Flanders) Bart Tommelein | Former Flemish minister mayor of Ostend | (West Flanders) Emmily Talpe | Mayor of Ypres |

Flemish Government Jambon
| Public Office | Name | Function |
|---|---|---|
| Vice Minister-President | Bart Somers | Internal Affairs, Administrative Affairs, Integration, and Equal Opportunities |
| Minister | Lydia Peeters | Mobility and Public Works |

Parliament of the Brussels-Capital Region
| Name | Notes |
|---|---|
| Carla Dejonghe | Faction Leader |
| Guy Vanhengel | Former federal minister |
| Khadija Zamouri | |

Brussels Regional Government Vervoort II
| Public Office | Name | Function |
|---|---|---|
| Minister | Sven Gatz | Finance, Budget, Civil Service, Promotion of Multilingualism, Tourism, Statistics, Urbanism, Heritage, the image of Brussels and bicultural issues of regional importance |

=== Provincial politics ===
Provincial Council
| Province | Percentage | Seats |
|---|---|---|
| Antwerp | 4.7% | 0 / 36 |
| Limburg | 12.7% | 3 / 31 |
| East Flanders | 11.3% | 4 / 36 |
| Flemish Brabant | 10.7% | 4 / 36 |
| West Flanders | 8% | 2 / 36 |

== Election results ==
=== Chamber of Representatives ===
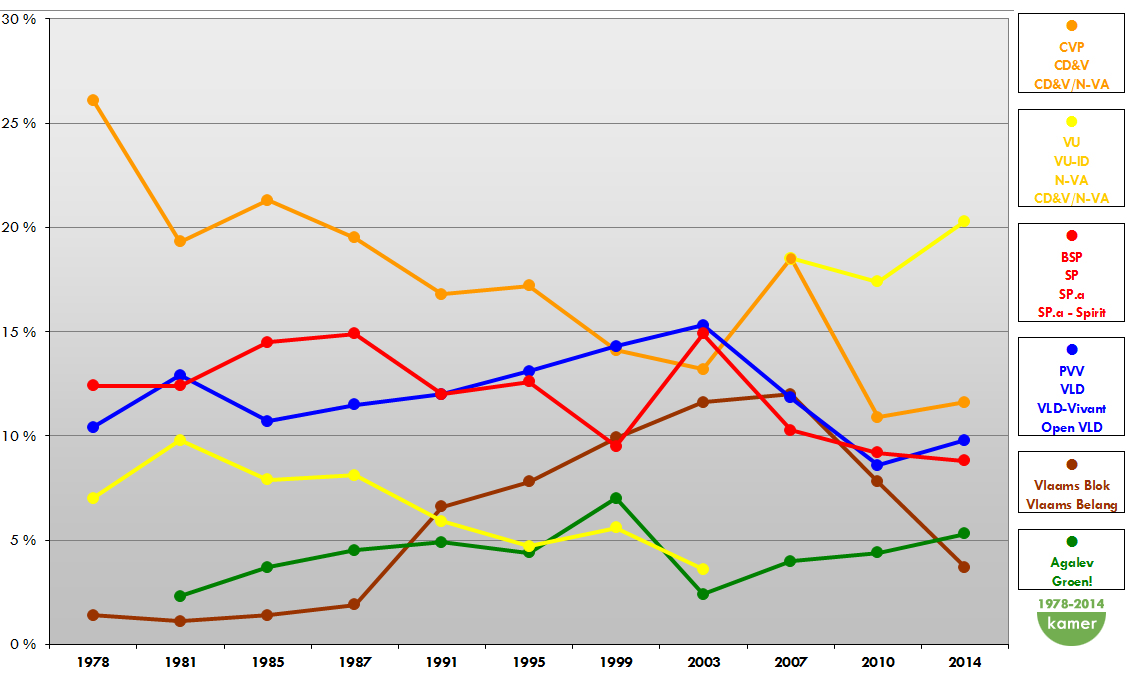
The main six Flemish political parties and their results for the Chamber of Representatives. From 1978 to 2014, in percentages for the complete Kingdom

| Election | Votes | % | Seats | +/- | Government |
|---|---|---|---|---|---|
| 1971 | 392,130 | 7.4 | 19 / 212 | | Opposition (1971-1973) |
| 1971 | 392,130 | 7.4 | 19 / 212 | | Coalition (1973-1974) |
| 1974 (Note: In coalition with Liberal Reformist Party) | 798,818 | 15.2 | 21 / 212 | ▲2 | Coalition |
| 1977 | 475,917 | 8.5 | 17 / 212 | ▼4 | Opposition |
| 1978 | 573,387 | 10.4 | 22 / 212 | ▲5 | Opposition (1978-1980) |
| 1978 | 573,387 | 10.4 | 22 / 212 | ▲5 | Coalition (1980) |
| 1978 | 573,387 | 10.4 | 22 / 212 | ▲5 | Opposition (1980-1981) |
| 1981 | 776,871 | 12.9 | 28 / 212 | ▲6 | Coalition |
| 1985 | 651,806 | 10.7 | 22 / 212 | ▼6 | Coalition |
| 1987 | 709,758 | 11.5 | 25 / 212 | ▲3 | Opposition |
| 1991 | 738,016 | 12.0 | 26 / 212 | ▲1 | Opposition |
| 1995 | 798,363 | 13.1 | 21 / 150 | ▼5 | Opposition |
| 1999 | 888,973 | 14.3 | 23 / 150 | ▲2 | Coalition |
| 2003 | 1,009,223 | 15.4 | 25 / 150 | ▲2 | Coalition |
| 2007 | 789,445 | 11.8 | 18 / 150 | ▼7 | Coalition |
| 2010 | 563,873 | 8.6 | 13 / 150 | ▼5 | Coalition |
| 2014 | 659,582 | 9.8 | 14 / 150 | ▲1 | Coalition |
| 2019 | 579,334 | 8.5 | 12 / 150 | ▼2 | Coalition |
| 2024 | 380,659 | 5.5 | 8 / 150 | ▼4 | Opposition |

=== Senate ===
| Election | Votes | % | Seats | +/- |
|---|---|---|---|---|
| 1971 | 776,514 | 14.9 | 6 / 106 | |
| 1974 | 755,694 | 14.6 | 10 / 106 | ▲4 |
| 1977 | 472,645 | 8.5 | 9 / 106 | ▼1 |
| 1978 | 572,535 | 10.4 | 11 / 106 | ▲2 |
| 1981 | 781,137 | 13.1 | 14 / 106 | ▲3 |
| 1985 | 637,776 | 10.5 | 11 / 106 | ▼3 |
| 1987 | 686,440 | 11.3 | 11 / 106 | 0 |
| 1991 | 713,542 | 11.7 | 13 / 106 | ▲2 |
| 1995 | 796,154 | 13.3 | 6 / 40 | ▼7 |
| 1999 | 952,116 | 15.4 | 6 / 40 | 0 |
| 2003 | 1,007,868 | 15.4 | 7 / 40 | ▲1 |
| 2007 | 821,980 | 12.4 | 5 / 40 | ▼2 |
| 2010 | 533,124 | 8.24 | 4 / 40 | ▼1 |
| 2014 | N/A | N/A | 5 / 60 | ▲1 |

=== Regional ===
==== Brussels Parliament ====
| Election | Votes | % | | Seats | +/- | Government |
| Election | Votes | D.E.C. | Overall | Seats | +/- | Government |
|---|---|---|---|---|---|---|
| 1989 | 12,143 | | 2.8 (#8) | 2 / 75 | | Opposition |
| 1995 | 11,034 | | 2.7 (#8) | 2 / 75 | 0 | Opposition |
| 1999 (Note: In coalition with VU) | 13,729 | 22.7 (#3) | 3.2 (#7) | 2 / 75 | 0 | Coalition |
| 2004 (Note: In coalition with Vivant) | 12,433 | 19.9 (#2) | 2.7 (#7) | 4 / 89 | ▲2 | Coalition |
| 2009 | 11,957 | 23.1 (#1) | 2.6 (#5) | 4 / 89 | 0 | Coalition |
| 2014 | 14,296 | 26.7 (#1) | 3.1 (#7) | 5 / 89 | ▲1 | Coalition |
| 2019 | 11,051 | 15.8 (#3) | 2.4 (#9) | 3 / 89 | ▼2 | Coalition |
| 2024 | 8,537 | 10.6 (#4) | 1.7 (#10) | 2 / 89 | ▼1 | TBA |

==== Flemish Parliament ====
| Election | Votes | % | Seats | +/- | Government |
|---|---|---|---|---|---|
| 1995 | 761,262 | 20.2 (#2) | 26 / 124 | | Opposition |
| 1999 | 855,867 | 21.7 (#2) | 27 / 124 | ▲1 | Coalition |
| 2004 | 804,578 | 19.8 (#3) | 25 / 124 | ▼2 | Coalition |
| 2009 | 616,610 | 15.0 (#4) | 21 / 124 | ▼4 | Opposition |
| 2014 | 594,469 | 14.2 (#3) | 19 / 124 | ▼2 | Coalition |
| 2019 | 556,630 | 13.1 (#4) | 16 / 124 | ▼3 | Coalition |
| 2024 | 364,609 | 8.3 (#5) | 9 / 124 | ▼7 | Opposition |

=== Provincial councils ===
| Election | Votes | % | Councilors | +/- |
|---|---|---|---|---|
| 1994 | 708,769 | | 84 / 401 | |
| 2000 | 909,428 | | 106 / 411 | ▲22 |
| 2006 | 745,952 | 18.9 | 80 / 411 | ▼26 |
| 2012 | 595,932 | 14.6 | 54 / 351 | ▼26 |
| 2018 | 570,601 | 13.7 | 23 / 175 | ▼31 |

=== European Parliament ===
| Election | List leader | Votes | % | | Seats | +/- | EP Group |
| Election | List leader | Votes | D.E.C. | Overall | Seats | +/- | EP Group |
|---|---|---|---|---|---|---|---|
| 1994 | Willy De Clercq | 678,421 | 18.36 (#2) | 11.37 | 3 / 25 | New | ELDR |
| 1999 | Annemie Neyts-Uyttebroeck | 847,099 | 21.88 (#2) | 13.61 | 3 / 25 | 0 | ELDR |
| 2004 | Guy Verhofstadt | 880,279 | 21.91 (#2) | 13.56 | 3 / 24 | 0 | ALDE |
| 2009 | Guy Verhofstadt | 837,834 | 20.56 (#2) | 12.75 | 3 / 22 | 0 | ALDE |
| 2014 | Guy Verhofstadt | 858,872 | 20.40 (#2) | 12.84 | 3 / 21 | 0 | ALDE |
| 2019 | Guy Verhofstadt | 678,051 | 15.95 (#3) | 10.07 | 2 / 21 | ▼1 | RE |
| 2024 | Hilde Vautmans | 410,743 | 9.11 (#4) | 5.76 | 1 / 22 | ▼1 | RE |

== International ==
The party is a member of the Liberal International, which was co-chaired by Annemie Neyts, member of Open VLD.

== Presidents ==
- 1992–1995 Guy Verhofstadt
- 1995–1997 Herman De Croo
- 1997–1999 Guy Verhofstadt
- 1999–2004 Karel De Gucht
- 2004 Dirk Sterckx
- 2004–2009 Bart Somers
- 2009 Guy Verhofstadt
- 2009–2012 Alexander De Croo
- 2012 Vincent Van Quickenborne
- 2012–2020 Gwendolyn Rutten
- 2020–2023 Egbert Lachaert
- 2023–2024 Tom Ongena
- 2024–2025 Eva De Bleeker
- 2025-present Frédéric De Gucht

== Notable members ==
- Maggie De Block, Minister of Social Affairs and Health
- Fons Borginon, former VLD floor leader in the Belgian Chamber of Representatives
- Patricia Ceysens, former Flemish Minister of the Economy and former VLD floor leader in the Flemish Parliament
- Alexander De Croo, UNDP-administrator and former party leader, Prime Minister and Minister of Finance
- Karel De Gucht, former party leader and former Minister of Foreign Affairs
- Patrick Dewael, former minister-president of Flanders and former Minister of Internal Affairs
- Margriet Hermans, former member of the Flemish Parliament and senator
- Marino Keulen, former Flemish Minister of Integration
- Goedele Liekens, sexologist and TV presenter
- Fientje Moerman, former vice-minister-president of Flanders
- Annemie Neyts, former party leader, former chairwoman of the Liberal International and former party leader of the ELDR Party.
- Karel Poma, former minister and member of parliament
- Bart Somers, former minister-president of Flanders and former party leader
- Bart Tommelein, Flemish Deputy Minister-President and Flemish Minister of Budget, Finance and Energy
- Jef Valkeniers, doctor and politician
- Dirk Van Mechelen, former Flemish Minister of Finance and Budget and Town and Country Planning
- Vincent Van Quickenborne, former Minister of Justice, also responsible for the simplification of the administration
- Guy Vanhengel, Brussels Minister of Finance and Budget
- Guy Verhofstadt, former party leader and former prime minister
- Marc Verwilghen, former minister of the Economy, Trade, Science and Energy

== Notable former members ==
- Boudewijn Bouckaert, a former VLD board member who left the party subsequently to Dedecker's exclusion, believing the party turned "left-liberal". He and Dedecker are founders of a new political party, List Dedecker, later renamed Libertarian, Direct, Democratic.
- Hugo Coveliers, left the VLD to found his own political party VLOTT.
- Jean-Marie Dedecker, was excluded from the VLD after several conflicts with the top of the party. He asked for an economic policy more in favour of free markets and limited government and believed that the party was too closely aligned with the Socialists. He founded the List Dedecker party, later Libertarian, Direct, Democratic.
- Leo Govaerts, left the VLD to found his own political party Veilig Blauw (Safe Blue).
- Ward Beysen, left the VLD to found his own political party Liberal Appeal.
- Sihame El Kaouakibi, left the VLD after claims of embezzlement.

== See also ==
- Contributions to liberal theory
- Liberaal Vlaams Verbond (LVV)
- Liberal Flemish Students' Union
- Liberal Archive
- Liberal democracy
- Liberales
- Liberalism
- Liberalism in Belgium
- Liberalism worldwide
- List of liberal parties
