= Eva De Bleeker =

Belgian politician (born 1974)

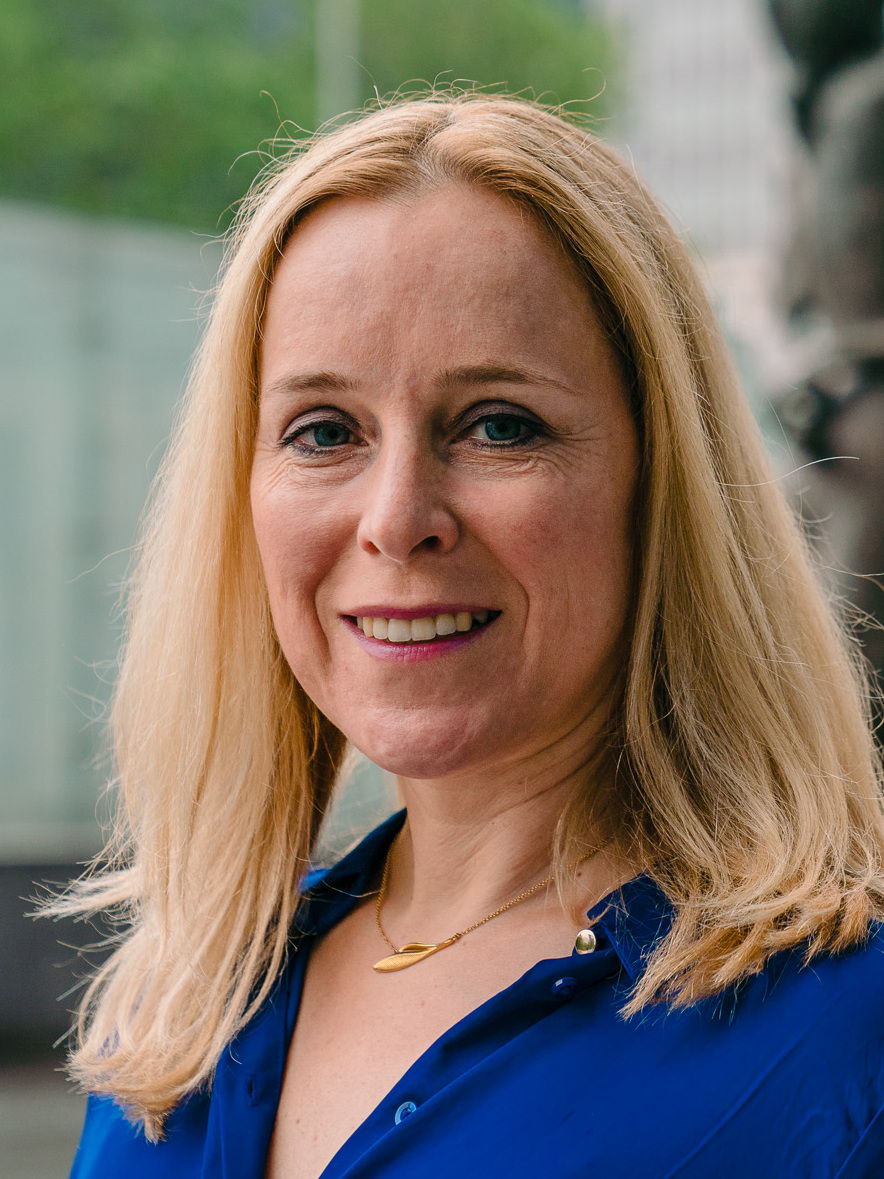
- De Bleeker in 2021

President of Open VLD
- In office 24 August 2024 – 17 October 2025
- Vice President: Alexander De Croo
- Preceded by: Tom Ongena
- Succeeded by: Frédéric De Gucht

Secretary of State for Budget and Consumer Protection
- In office 1 October 2020 – 19 November 2022
- Monarch: Philippe
- Prime Minister: Alexander De Croo
- Preceded by: David Clarinval (as Minister of Budget); Nathalie Muylle (as Minister of Consumer Affairs)
- Succeeded by: Alexia Bertrand

Member of the Flemish Parliament
- Incumbent
- Assumed office 2 July 2024
- Constituency: Flemish Brabant

Personal details
- Born: 2 August 1974 (age 52) Sint-Niklaas, Belgium
- Party: Anders
- Education: Vrije Universiteit Brussel; University of Warwick

Eva De Bleeker (born 2 August 1974) is a Belgian politician who served as leader of the liberal party Anders (formerly Open Flemish Liberals and Democrats) from 2024 to 2025. She has been a member of the Flemish Parliament since 2024. From 2020 to 2022, she served as secretary of state for budget and consumer protection. She served as schepen of Hoeilaart from 2013 to 2020 and from February to December 2024.
