= Jean-Jacques De Gucht =

Belgian politician

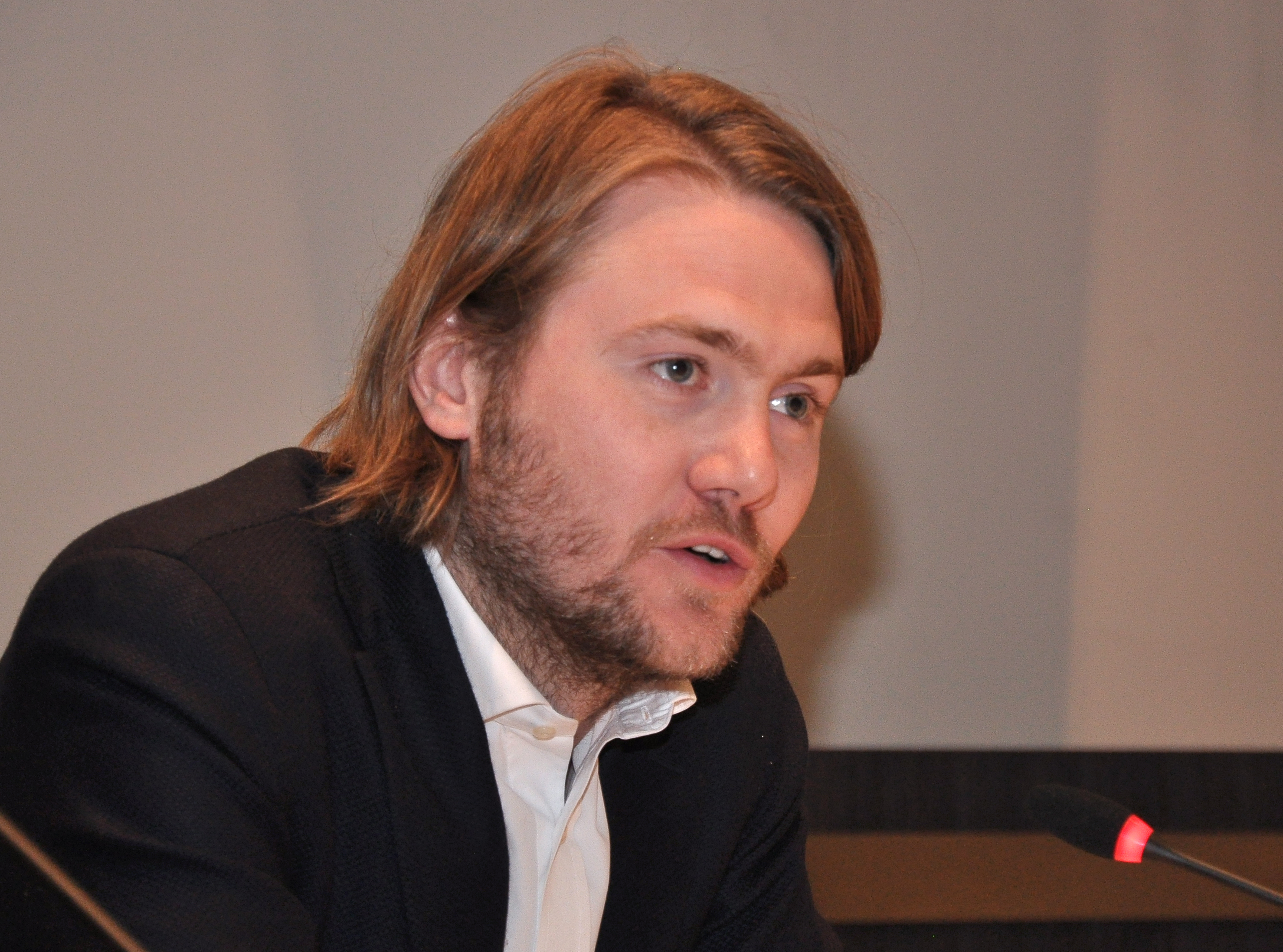

Senator
- In office 28 June 2007 – May 2010

Personal details
- Born: 9 December 1983 (age 42)
- Party: Anders
- Parent: Karel De Gucht (father)
- Relatives: Frédéric De Gucht (brother)
- Website: www.jeanjacquesdegucht.be

Jean-Jacques De Gucht (born 9 December 1983) is a Flemish politician for Anders (formerly Open Flemish Liberals and Democrats). He was elected to the Belgian Senate by the Dutch electoral college in the 2007 Belgian federal election, which took place on 10 June 2007.

Jean-Jacques De Gucht is the son of Karel De Gucht, former European Commissioner for Trade Policy, Belgian Minister of Foreign Affairs and chairman of the Flemish Liberals and Democrats. As with Jean Sarkozy, criticism has been levied over the perceived nepotism which led to his appointment, at the age of 27, as the head of the electoral list for the Open VLD party in the 2007 federal elections for the province of East Flanders, despite his lack of any relevant work experience.

In late 2013 and early 2014, the Belgian Federal Parliament approved a bill he co-sponsored to legalise euthanasia for minors.
