= Berlare =

- Municipality
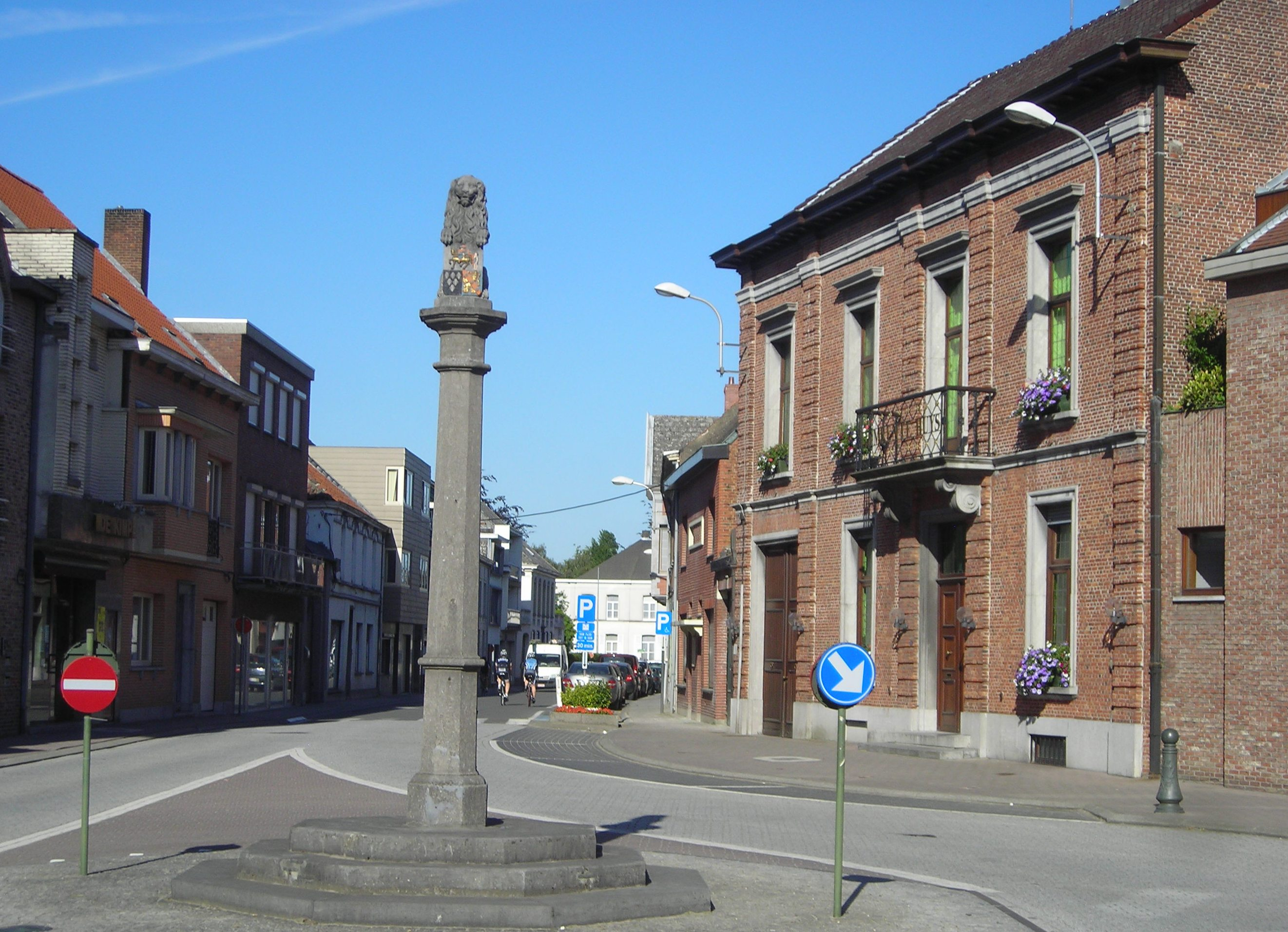

- Flag Coat of arms

- Location of Berlare in East Flanders
- Interactive map of Berlare
- Location in Belgium
- Coordinates: 51°01′30″N 04°00′09″E
- Country: Belgium
- Community: Flemish Community
- Region: Flemish Region
- Province: East Flanders
- Arrondissement: Dendermonde

Government
  - Mayor: Katja Gabriëls (Open VLD)
  - Governing parties: Open VLD, N-VA

Area
  - Total: 38.23 km^{2} (14.76 sq mi)

Population (2018-01-01)
  - Total: 14,849
  - Density: 388.4/km^{2} (1,006/sq mi)
- Postal codes: 9290
- NIS code: 42003
- Area codes: 09, 052
- Website: www.berlare.be

Berlare (Dutch pronunciation: [ˈbɛrlaːrə]) is a municipality located in the Belgian province of East Flanders. The municipality comprises the towns of Berlare proper, Overmere and Uitbergen, as well as the village Donk. The Donkmeer, a large lake and a regional tourist attraction, is located centrally in the municipality. In 2021, Berlare had a total population of 15,222.

== History ==
It was where the 1798 rebellion against French rule, known as the "Peasants' War" began in 1798.

== Places of interest ==
- The church of Saint Martin and a 17th-century pillory in the center of Berlare proper. The Castle of Berlare, also in the town centre, was opened to the public in 2012.
- The Bareldonk Chapel, built in the 14th century and expanded in 1774 in Rococo style, is situated in Donk. There is a Way of the Cross and calvary with sculptures by Aloïs De Beule next to the chapel.
- The Donkmeer is a lake, about 86 ha in size, that came into existence through the harvesting of peat.
- Recreation area Nieuwdonk.
- Forested areas with trails include Berlare Broek and the Gratiebossen.
- Riekend Rustpunt is a very small museum about the historic river transport of manure from the city to the countryside.

== Gallery ==
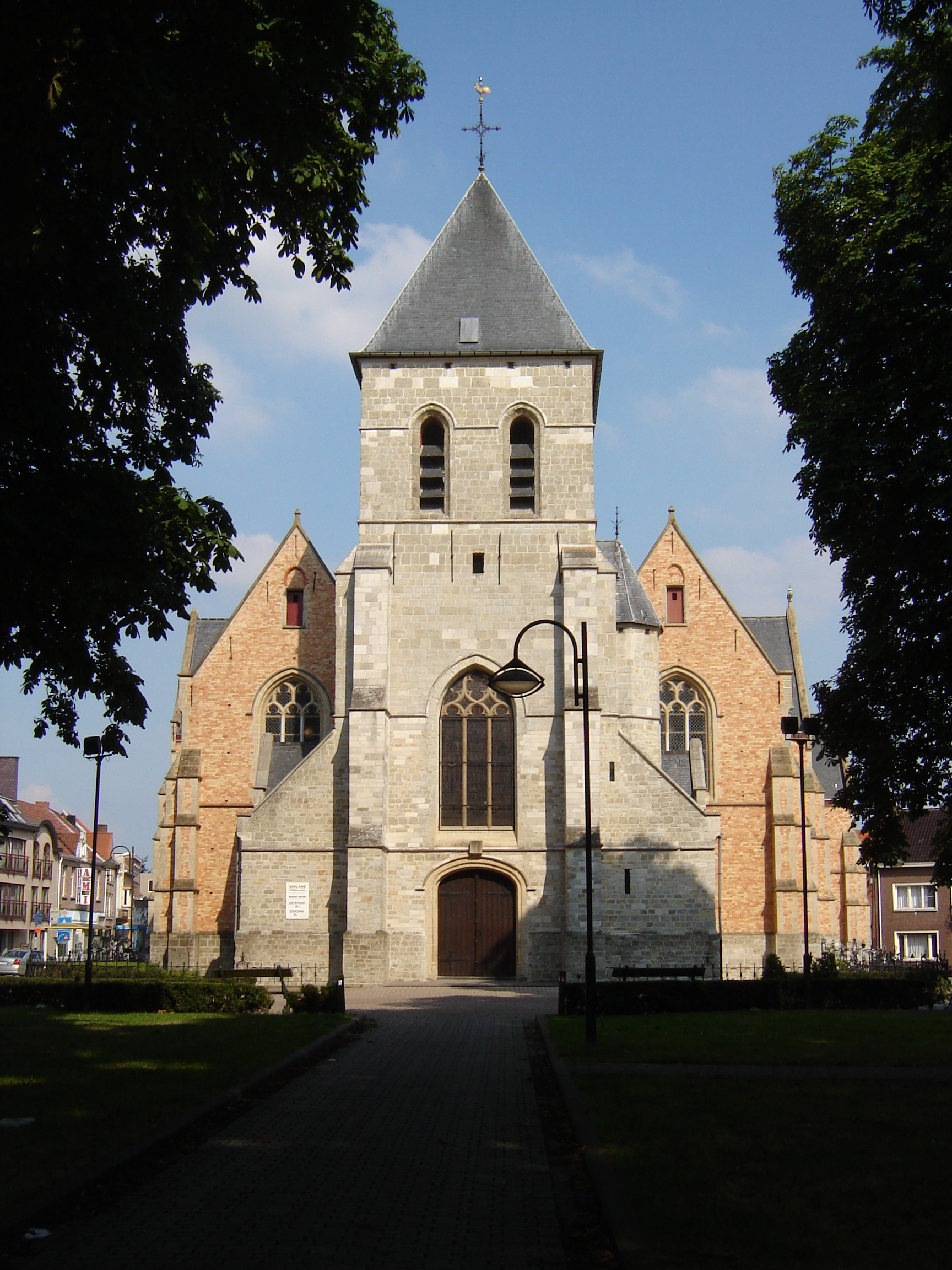
Saint Martin's in Berlare

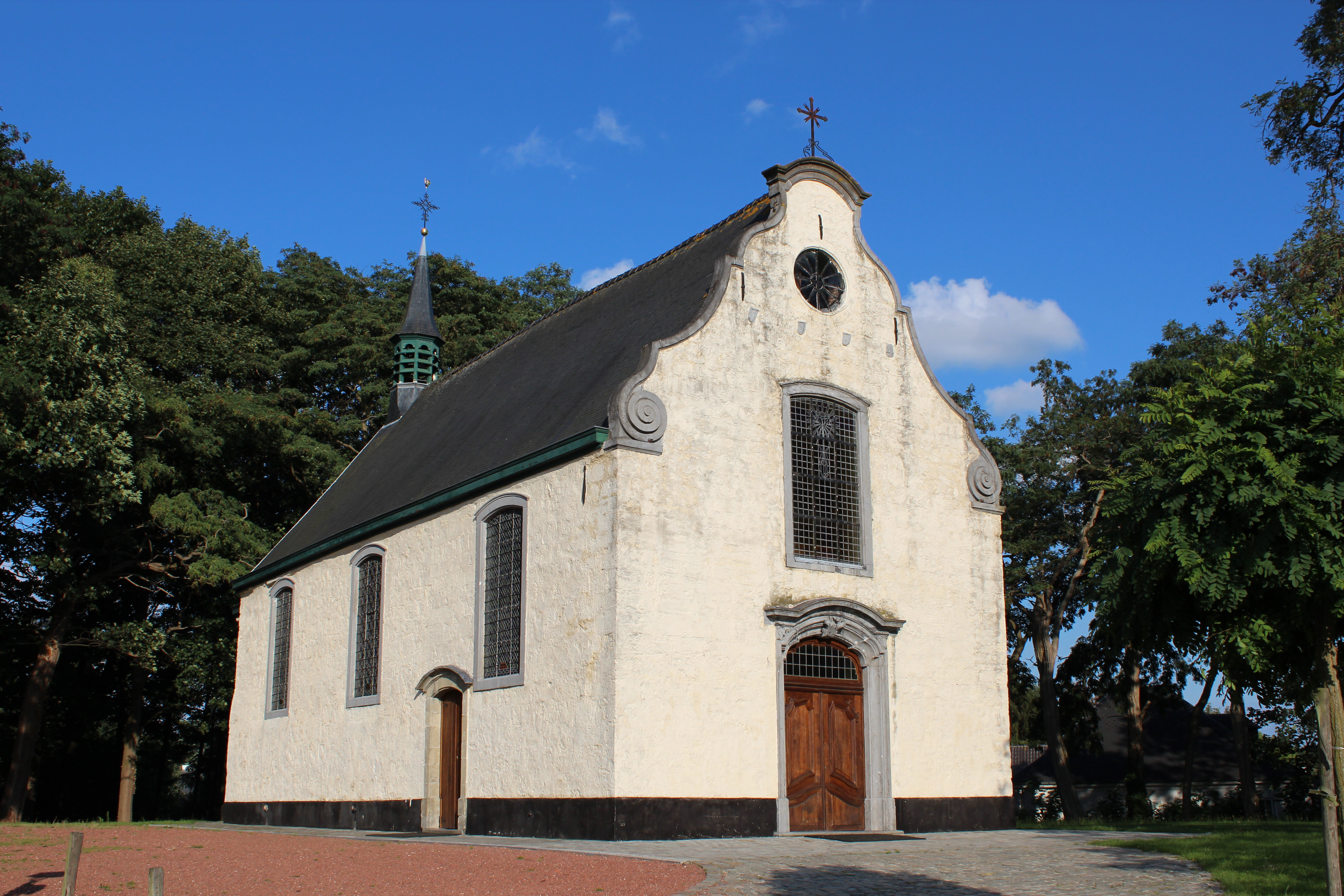
The Bareldonk Chapel in the village Donk

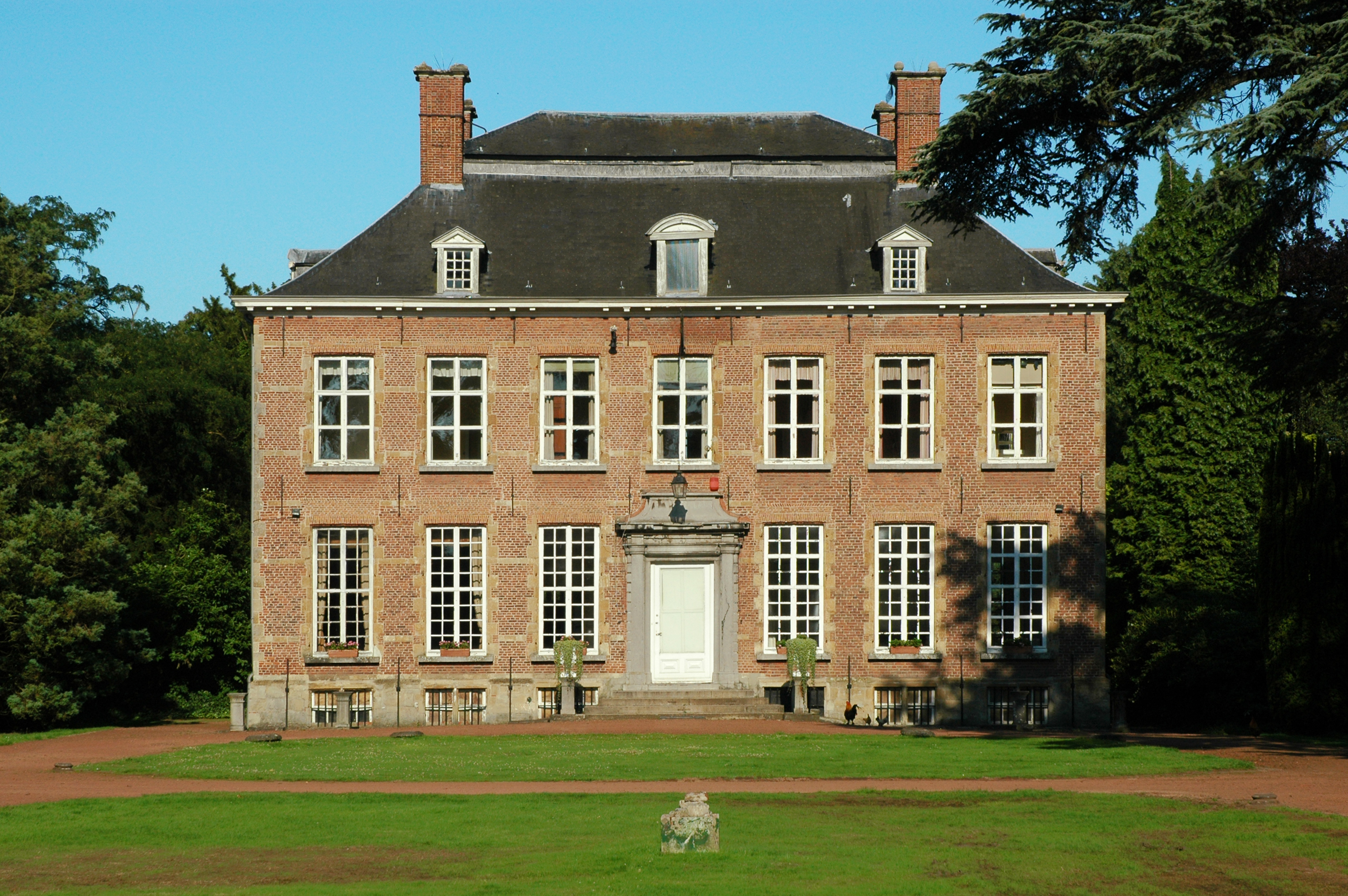
The Castle of Berlare

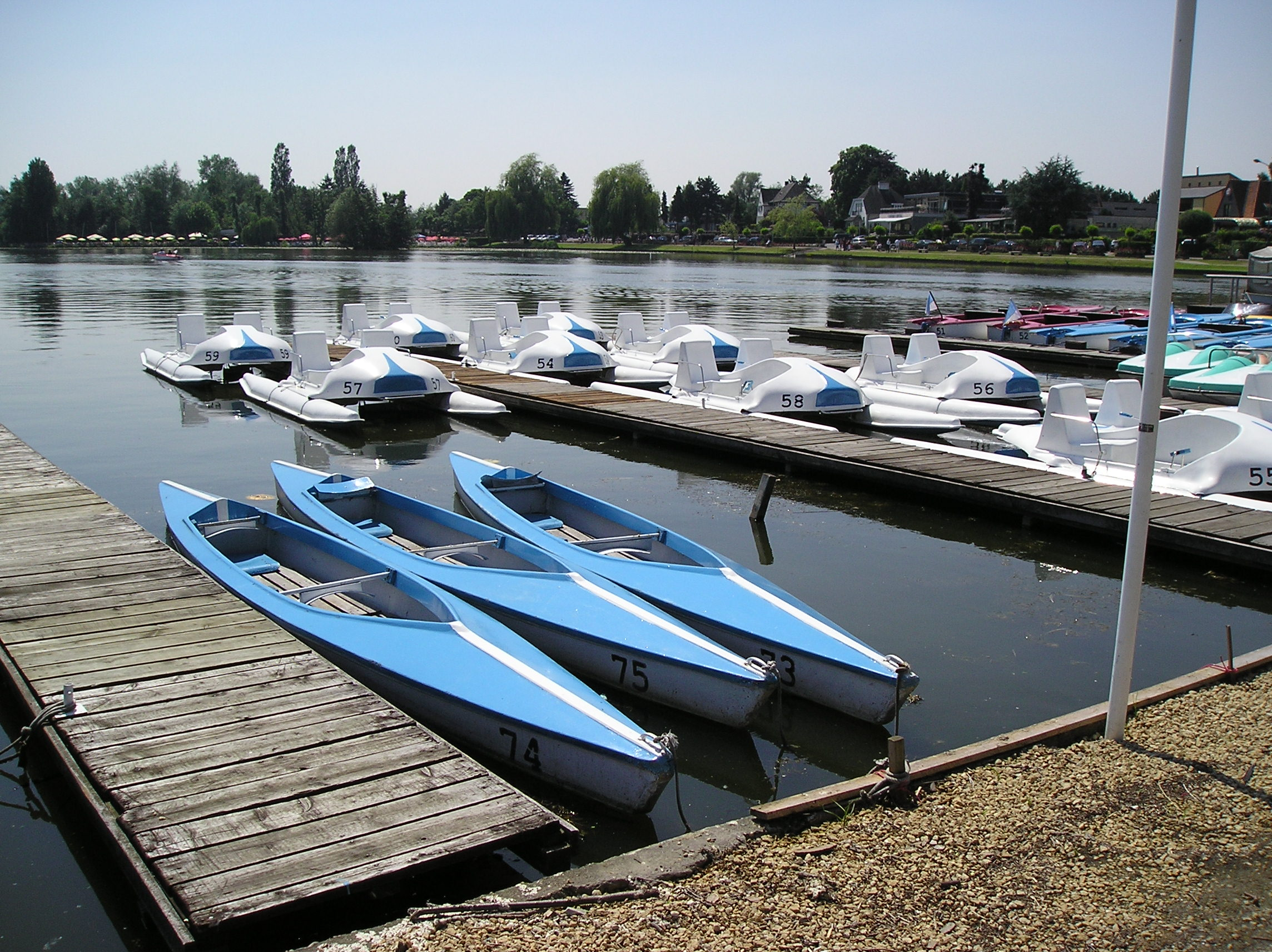
The Donkmeer is a regional tourist attraction

== Notable people ==
- Tjörven De Brul, soccer player
- Fred De Bruyne, cyclist and TV commentator
- Karel De Gucht, politician
- Paul Cammermans, film director and actor
- Yves Van Der Straeten, soccer player
- Preben Van Hecke, cyclist
- Frank Van Laecke, theater, opera, musical and TV director
- Cecile Bombeek, serial killer

== Sports ==
Berlare has hosted the Triathlon Donkmeer for over forty years

- BrigandZe Rugby Compagnie (2008)
