= BrigandZe Rugby Compagnie =

- Founded: 2008
- Location: Berlare, Belgium
- Coach: Jorgen Jorritsma
Team kit

BrigandZe Rugby Compagnie is a Belgian rugby club in Berlare.

== History ==
The club was founded in 2008.
