= Donkmeer =

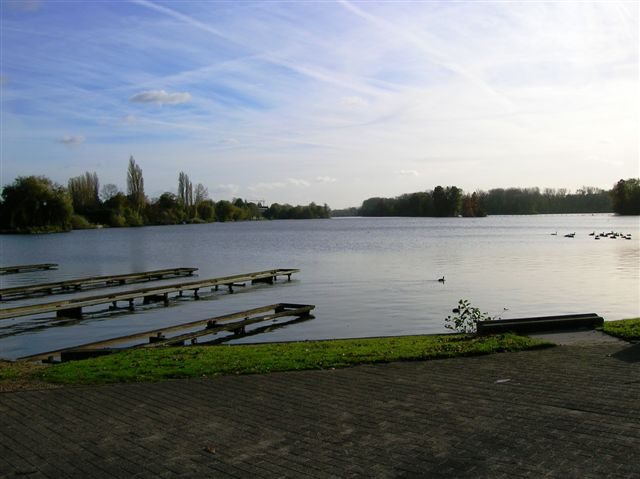

- Location within Belgium
- Location: Berlare, East Flanders
- Coordinates: 51°02′32″N 3°58′38″E
- Type: natural freshwater lake
- Basin countries: Belgium
- Max. length: 1.57 kilometres (0.98 mi)
- Max. width: 0.7 kilometres (0.43 mi)
- Surface area: 86 ha (210 acres)
- Islands: several islets

Donkmeer (meer is 'lake' in Dutch) is a lake in Belgium. It is situated in East Flanders in the municipality of Berlare. There are boats and waterbikes for hire. At the north end a fountain is in the lake.
