= Tom Ongena =

Belgian politician and lawyer

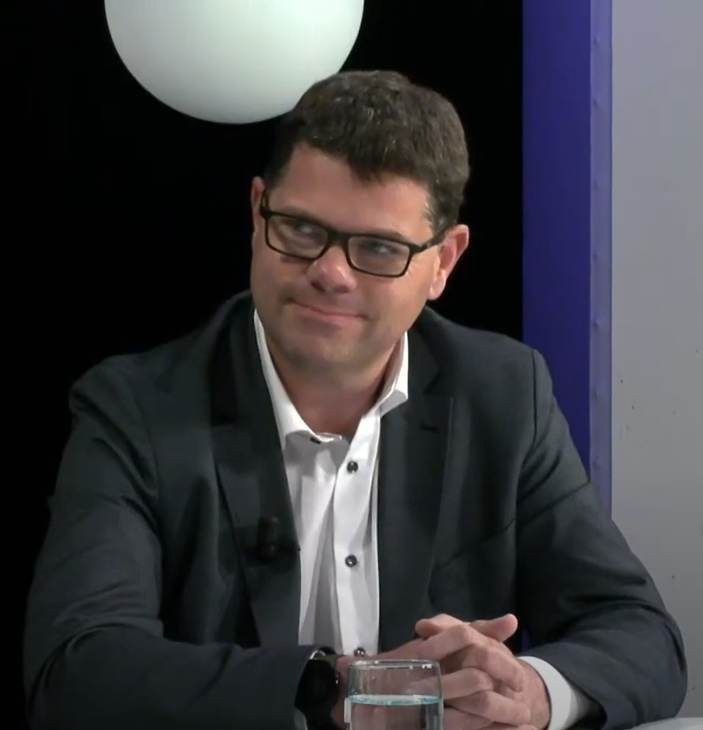

Leader of Open VLD
- In office 23 September 2023 – 24 August 2024
- Preceded by: Egbert Lachaert
- Succeeded by: Eva De Bleeker

Member of the Flemish Parliament
- Incumbent
- Assumed office 2019

Member of the Belgian Senate
- Incumbent
- Assumed office 2020

Personal details
- Born: September 20, 1975 (age 51) Cologne, West Germany
- Party: Anders
- Education: University of Antwerp
- Occupation: Politician

Tom Ongena (Dutch pronunciation: [tɔm ˈɔŋɣənaː]; born 20 September 1975) is a Belgian politician for Anders (formerly Open Flemish Liberals and Democrats, Dutch: Open Vld) born in Germany and has served as chairman of the party from 2023 to 2024.

== Biography ==
Ongena was born in Cologne, Germany in 1975 before moving to Belgium as a teenager. He obtained a law degree from the University of Antwerp and from 1998 to 2003 he worked as a researcher in international criminal law and criminal procedural law at the university. He was then a political director for Flemish minister Bart Somers and later an advisor to Minister of Asylum and Migration Maggie De Block in 2019.

During the 2019 Belgian regional elections, he was elected in first place on the Open VLD's list to the Flemish Parliament for the Antwerp constituency and was delegated as a member of the Belgian Senate.

In July 2023, he was appointed as temporary chairman of the Open VLD party at the recommendation of Alexander De Croo after Egbert Lachaert resigned as chairman a few days earlier. A few months later in September, he was officially elected as leader of the party. The election was seen as controversial as the Open VLD's leadership process did not take place via a direct vote which had been how previous chairmen were elected where members could also cast their votes digitally or by letter, but via a vote that required physical presence at the Open VLD party congress and for which an amendment to the articles of association was approved at the same congress. According to critics, this restricted the party's membership democracy.

After the 2024 Belgian federal election, Ogena announced his resignation on June 9, 2024.
