= Overmere =

Village in Belgium

Coat of arms of Overmere

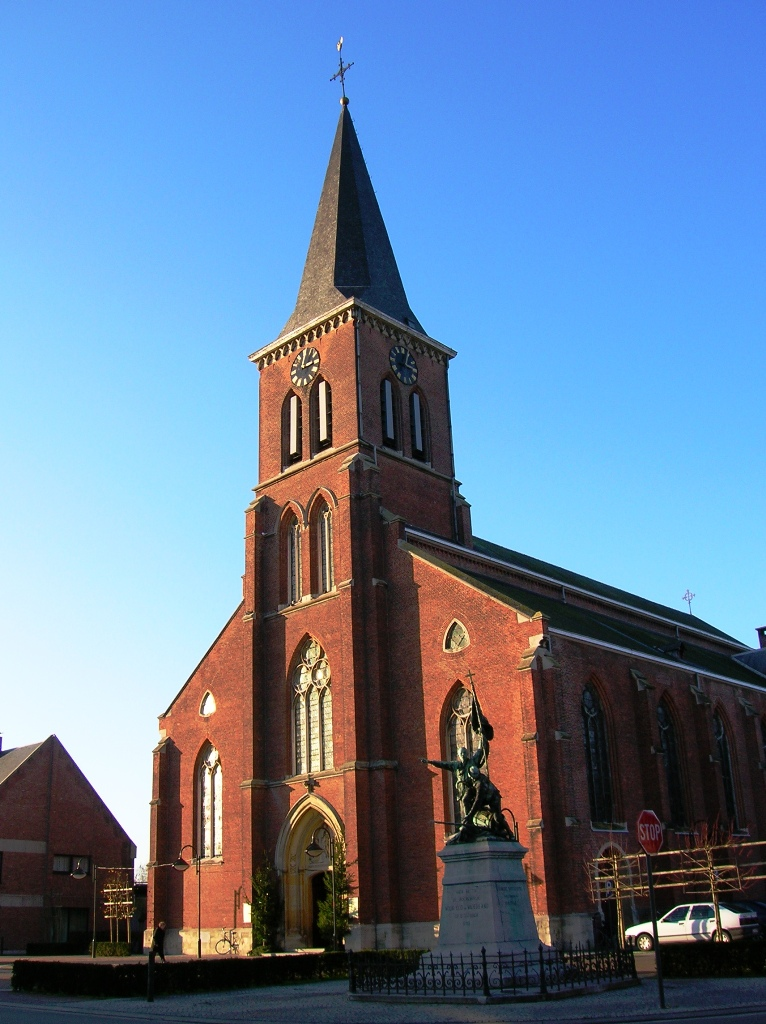
Church in Overmere

Overmere is a village in the Belgian province of East Flanders and is a submunicipality of Berlare. It was an independent municipality until the municipal reorganization of 1977.

In 1331 Overmere formed one lordship with Uitbergen. Overmere also formed one parish with Uitbergen, with the church in Uitbergen and a chapel in Overmere. This chapel was replaced by a church in 1350.
