= Gwendolyn Rutten =

Belgian politician (born 1975)

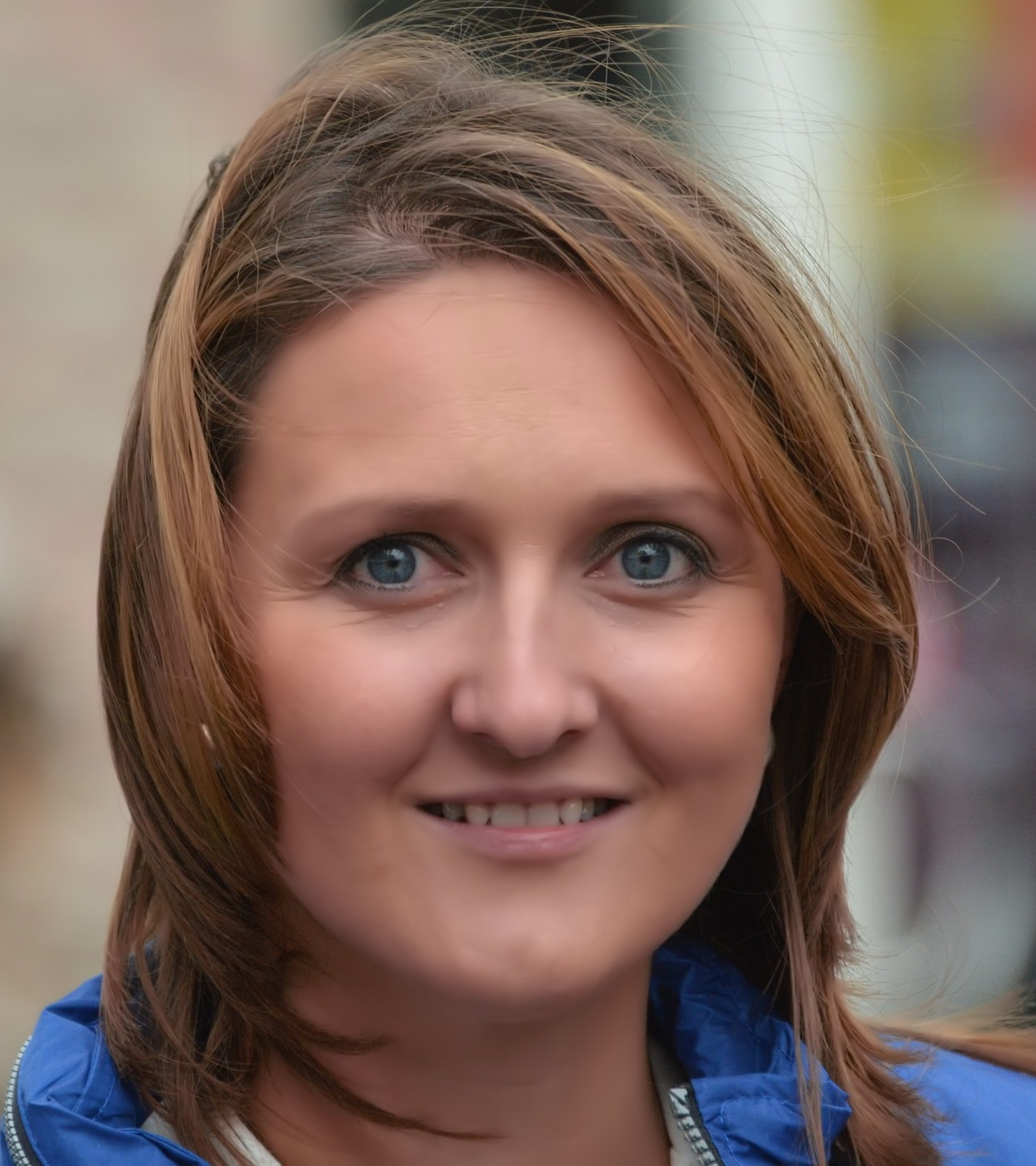

Personal details
- Born: 26 June 1975 (age 51) Hasselt, Belgium
- Party: Anders
- Education: Catholic University of Leuven
- Website: Official website

Gwendolyn Angeline Albert Maria Rutten (born 26 June 1975) is a Belgian politician for Anders (formerly Open Flemish Liberals and Democrats) who served as its chairwoman until March 22, 2020. On 11 January 2017 she resigned from the Flemish Parliament in order to prepare her party for the local election of 2018.

Rutten was born in Hasselt, and read Law and International Politics at the Catholic University of Leuven.

She is also city councillor in Aarschot since 1 January 2007, and schepen since 1 January 2013.

== Career ==
- 2010–2014: Member of the Chamber of Representatives
- 2014-2017: Member of the Flemish Parliament
- 2012–2020: Chairperson of Open VLD
- 2020–present: Member of the Flemish Parliament
