= Yves Van Der Straeten =

Belgian footballer

Personal information
- Date of birth: 18 January 1971 (age 55)
- Place of birth: Berlare, Belgium
- Height: 1.86 m (6 ft 1 in)
- Position: Goalkeeper

Senior career*
Years	Team	Apps	(Gls)
1990–1992	Beveren	39	(0)
1992–1996	Antwerp	60	(0)
1996–2000	Marítimo	112	(0)
2000–2006	Lierse	124	(0)

Managerial career
- 2009–2014: SK Berlare
- 2015: Eendracht Zele
- 2016–2017: KSV Temse
- 2017–2018: KRC Gent
- 2018–2020: KSV Temse
- * Club domestic league appearances and goals

Yves Van Der Straeten (born 18 January 1971) is a Belgian retired professional footballer who played as a goalkeeper, primarily in the Jupiler Pro League - the top flight of Belgian football. He had a career as a coach from 2009 until 2020.

Though never on the pitch during an international match, he was selected for the Belgium national squad four times throughout his senior career - most notably in October 2000, in a game against Latvia during the qualifying stages of the 2002 World Cup. The match, which was held in the Skonto Stadium in Latvia, was supposed to see Jan Moons on the bench for the Belgians, it is reported, but Moons' passport was expired, and as such Van Der Straeten took his place. Ultimately, only starter Geert De Vlieger played. Belgium won 4–0.
