= LVSV =

Student organisations in Belgium

Liberaal Vlaams Studentenverbond
Establishment	December 8, 1930 (Ghent); January 7, 1937 (Brussels); 1939 (Antwerp); December 29, 1972 (Leuven); December 4, 2009 (Hasselt)
Ideology	Liberalism/Libertarianism
President	Yearly rotation (currently held by the president of LVSV Antwerp - 2025-2026)
European organisations	ESFL
Website	www.lvsv.be

The LVSV (Liberaal Vlaams StudentenVerbond (Dutch) or Liberal Flemish Students' Association) unites all Dutch-speaking classical-liberal and libertarian students in Belgium. The values they uphold are individual freedom, freedom of speech, free trade and human rights, with focus on the non-aggression principle. The LVSV opposes big government in any meaning (both right-wing and left-wing). They are an independent organisation, not affiliated to any political party. The LVSV organises political activities (debates, discussions,...) as well as typical student activities (visiting pubs, organising a cantus,...) in five cities: Antwerp, Brussels, Ghent, Hasselt and Leuven. The national presidency of the association rotates between the local presidents every year.

The first LVSV branch was founded on December 8, 1930 by Max Cosijns as a result of the “Dutchification” of University of Ghent. In 1932 LVSV Ghent joined the Liberal Flemish League. In 1937 another branch was founded in Brussels by Raymond Schepmans who was elected as their President on January 20, 1937. Both branches would later join the Belgisch Liberaal Studentenverbond/Fédération des Étudiants Libéraux (BSVL/FEL) which oversaw all liberal student associations from both the Dutch- and the French-speaking region of the country. In 1972 all LVSV branches discontinued their partnership with the BSVL/FEL with the reason being that only French was spoken at the conferences held by the BSVL/FEL. This led to the establishment of LVSV National which would take over the responsibilities from the BSVL/FEL.

Famous former members include Guy Verhofstadt (Open VLD), Bart De Wever (N-VA), Zuhal Demir (N-VA), Willy De Clercq (Open VLD), Karel De Gucht (Open VLD) and Egbert Lachaert (Open VLD).

== See also ==
- Olivaint Conference of Belgium
