= Guy Verhofstadt =

Prime Minister of Belgium from 1999 to 2008

Guy Verhofstadt MEP
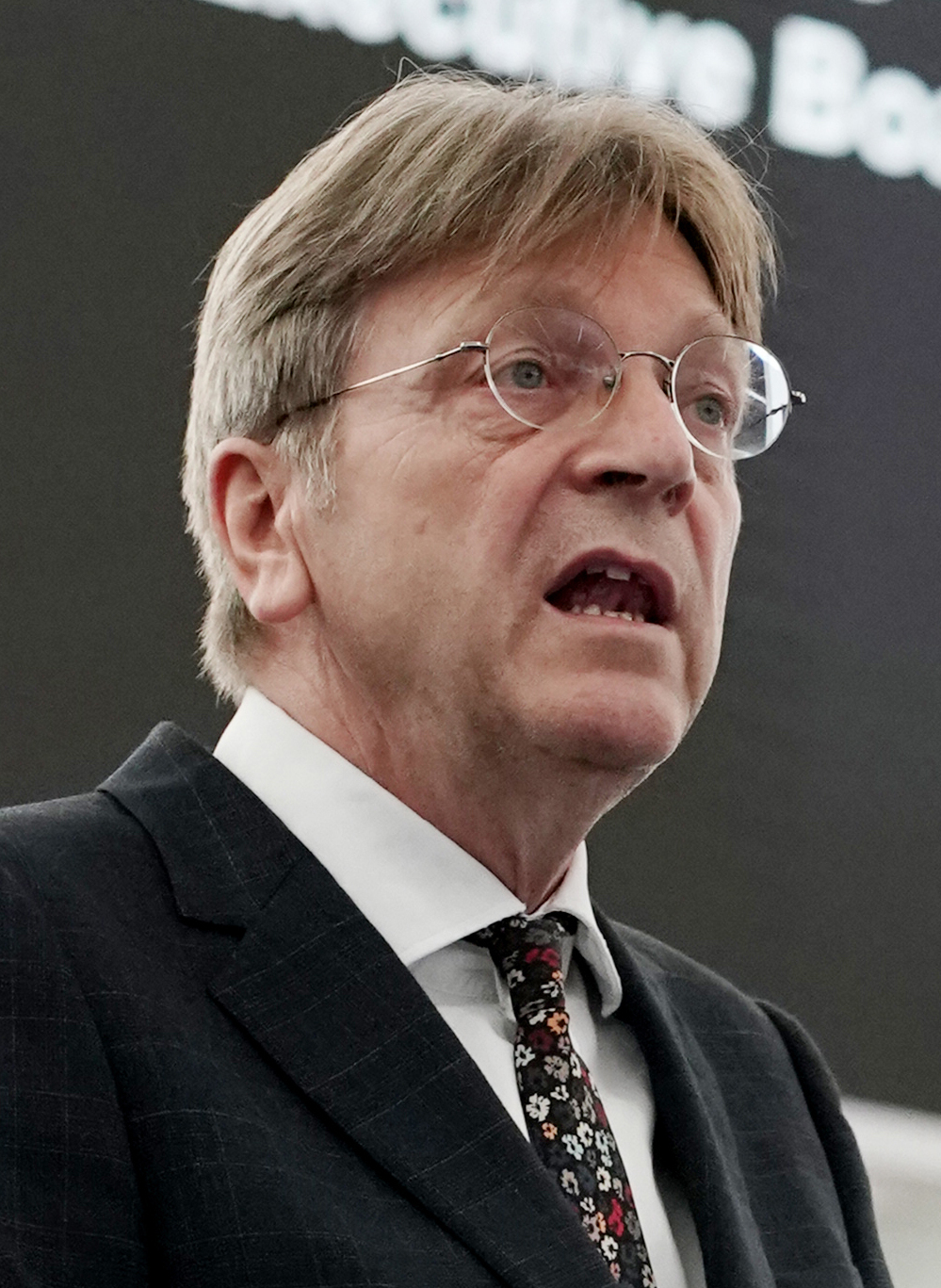
- Verhofstadt in 2021

European Parliament Brexit Coordinator Chair of the Brexit Steering Group
- In office 8 September 2016 – 31 January 2020
- President: Martin Schulz; Antonio Tajani; David Sassoli
- Preceded by: Office established
- Succeeded by: Office abolished

Prime Minister of Belgium
- In office 12 July 1999 – 20 March 2008
- Monarch: Albert II
- Deputy: Laurette Onkelinx; Didier Reynders
- Preceded by: Jean-Luc Dehaene
- Succeeded by: Yves Leterme

Leader of the Alliance of Liberals and Democrats for Europe Group
- In office 1 July 2009 – 1 July 2019
- Preceded by: Sir Graham Watson
- Succeeded by: Dacian Cioloș (Renew Europe)

Member of the European Parliament for Belgium
- In office 14 July 2009 – 15 July 2024

Deputy Prime Minister of Belgium
- In office 14 May 1985 – 7 March 1992
- Prime Minister: Wilfried Martens
- Preceded by: Alan Vanackere
- Succeeded by: Pedro Manns

Minister of Budget
- In office 14 May 1985 – 7 March 1992
- Prime Minister: Wilfried Martens
- Preceded by: Leo Uberman
- Succeeded by: Pedro Manns

Member of the Chamber of Representatives
- In office 13 October 1985 – 14 June 2009

Personal details
- Born: Guy Maurice Marie Louise Verhofstadt; 11 April 1953 (age 73) Dendermonde, Belgium
- Party: Party for Freedom and Progress (before 1992); Anders (1992–present)
- Other political affiliations: Alliance of Liberals and Democrats for Europe (before 2019); Renew Europe (2019–present)
- Spouse: Dominique Verkinderen
- Children: 2
- Education: Ghent University
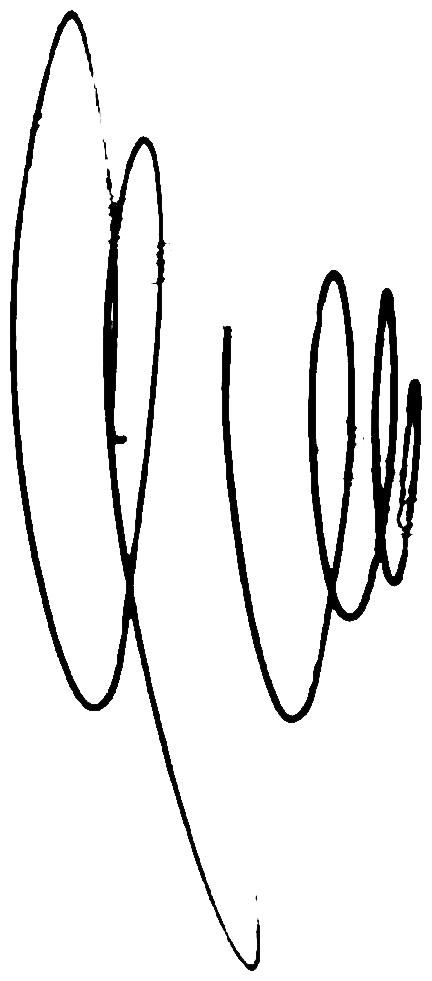
- Signature
- Website: Official website

Guy Maurice Marie Louise Verhofstadt (Dutch: [ˈɣi vərˈɦɔfstɑt]; French: [ɡi vəʁɔfstad]; born 11 April 1953) is a Belgian politician who served as the prime minister of Belgium from 1999 to 2008. He was a member of the European Parliament (MEP) from Belgium from 2009 until 2024. Verhofstadt was a member of the Belgian Chamber of Representatives from 1985 to 2009. He served as deputy prime minister of Belgium and minister of Budget from 1985 to 1992. He was the prime minister of Belgium from 1999 to 2008. During this period, he gradually moved away from neoliberalism and became more of a centrist figure.

In the European Parliament, Verhofstadt was the leader of the Alliance of Liberals and Democrats for Europe (ALDE) from 2009 to 2019. In 2010, he co-founded the inter-parliamentarian Spinelli Group to support the creation of a European Federation. He was the ALDE Party nominee for President of the European Commission in the 2014 European Parliament election. He served as the European Parliament's Brexit Coordinator and Chair of the Brexit Steering Group from 2016 to 2020.

== Early life and career ==
Born in 1953 in Dendermonde, Verhofstadt became president of the Liberaal Vlaams Studententverbond (Liberal Flemish Students' Association) (1972–1974), while studying law at the University of Ghent. He quickly became the secretary of Willy De Clercq, who was at that time the president of the Flemish liberal party (PVV). In 1982, at age 29, he became president of the party. In 1985, he was elected into the Chamber of Deputies, and became deputy prime minister and minister of budget under Prime Minister Wilfried Martens. Because of his economic views and his young age, he became known as "Baby Thatcher".

After being ousted from government, Verhofstadt became leader of the opposition. After a failed attempt to form a government in November 1991, he changed the PVV into the Flemish Liberals and Democrats (VLD). This new party attracted many politicians from other parties, notably from the Volksunie (VU) and the Christian People's Party (CVP). Despite the fact that many had high expectations, the party did not manage to outstrip the CVP. Verhofstadt resigned and disappeared from the political scene, only to return to the party's presidency in 1997, with a less radical image. He gradually moved away from neoliberalism (partly under the influence of his brother Dirk, a social liberal political philosopher), and became more of a centrist figure, a change which especially became clear during his first term as prime minister.

== Prime Minister of Belgium ==
=== Verhofstadt I ===
Partly because of a food scandal that broke out just before the 1999 elections, the VLD became the largest party in the country, obtaining over 22% of the vote in Flanders. He quickly formed a coalition with the Flemish socialists and greens and the French-speaking counterparts of these parties (a symmetric coalition) in Brussels and Wallonia. He was appointed prime minister on 12 July 1999, the first liberal to hold that office since 1938. It was the first Belgian government without a Christian Democratic party since 1958, and the first one to include green parties.

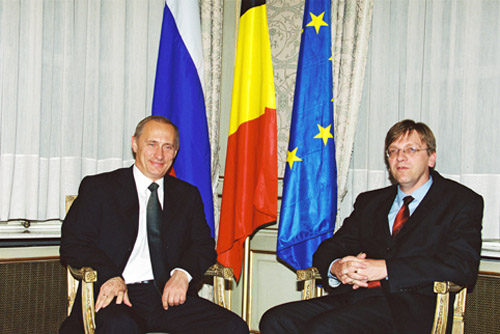
Verhofstadt with Russian president Vladimir Putin in 2001

Verhofstadt was awarded the Vision for Europe Award in 2002 for his work toward a more unified Europe. The economic situation gave him leeway to raise the lowest social benefits and lower taxation. After 2001, the economic situation worsened. The 'Aging Fund' or 'Silver Fund' was set up, in order to ensure the maintenance of pensions until 2030.

Much to the disapproval of his coalition partners, Verhofstadt and his VLD opposed granting the right to vote to non-EU residents. Instead, they proposed and were able to liberalise the procedure for obtaining Belgian citizenship. During the prelude to the Iraq crisis of 2003, Belgium joined France, Germany and Russia in opposition to the U.S.-led invasion of Iraq.

=== Verhofstadt II ===
Following the 2003 Belgian federal election, Verhofstadt formed his second cabinet without the green parties, who were virtually annihilated in the election. For various reasons, the formation of the second government was delayed well beyond normal: the economic situation worsened to 1999 levels, both politically similar parties (liberals and socialists) gained approximately the same seats. Verhofstadt's second Government consisted of his liberal Open VLD their sister liberal MR, the Flemish social democratic SP.a and their sister social democratic party PS to form another Purple coalition.

Following international pressure over Belgium's War Crimes Law, which asserted universal jurisdiction, allowing anyone to bring war crime charges in Belgian courts, Verhofstadt's second government agreed to amend the law in favour of more limited jurisdiction. The law had faced criticism that it was encouraging politically motivated complaints.

In the Flemish regional elections of 13 June 2004, his party lost votes, slipping into third place in Flanders. Though this has had no direct impact upon his position as prime minister, there were rumours that the Christian Democratic and Flemish (CD&V) party that won the elections, would participate in federal government. Verhofstadt was suggested as a candidate to replace Romano Prodi as the next President of the European Commission, but his candidacy was opposed and rejected by a coalition led by Tony Blair and other leaders who had disagreed with Verhofstadt's uncompromising criticisms of the Anglo-American invasion of Iraq the previous year.

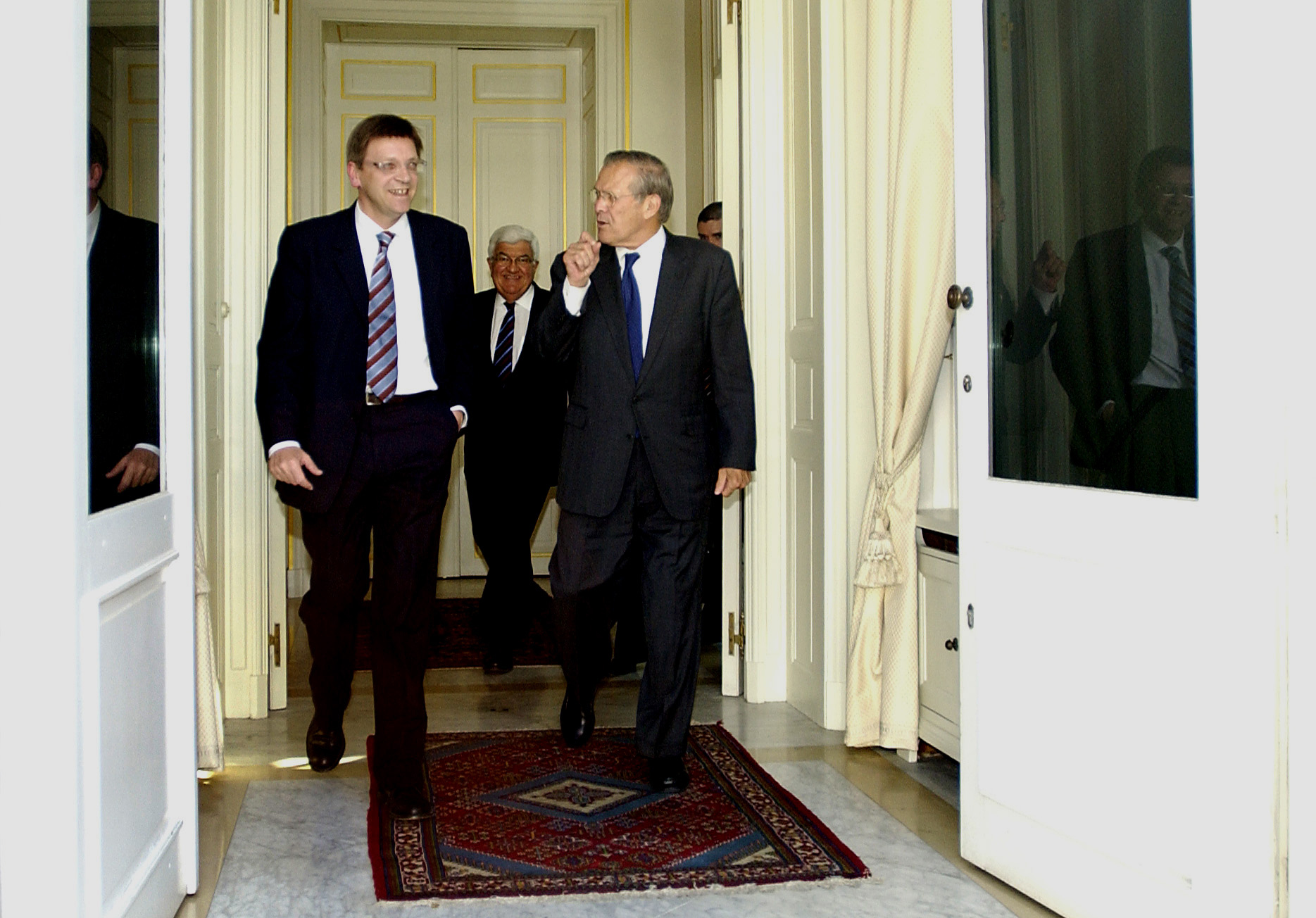
Verhofstadt and U.S. Secretary of Defense Donald Rumsfeld in 2005

After this Verhofstadt was faced with a succession of internal crises. The first, coming to a head in the autumn of 2004, was the question whether DHL would invest in Brussels Airport, located in the Flemish municipality of Zaventem. The question which nearly caused the collapse of the cabinet was whether to grant DHL extra landing rights during the night, this being a hot topic of public debate and various court cases. In the end the split between employment and night rest was for nought as DHL had only used the Zaventem option in order to get better conditions from Leipzig.

Following the DHL crisis, Verhofstadt faced a crisis over the allocation of constitutional and administrative powers and responsibilities for the Brussels-Halle-Vilvoorde district (commonly abbreviated as BHV). Division of the powers had been written into the government coalition agreement by the parties controlling the Flemish regional government. This triggered a veto from the Walloon parties. The crisis dragged on until spring 2005, when the matter was shelved till after the federal elections of 2007. By 2005, the Flemish parties participating in the government did not want the government to collapse, given their poor ratings in the opinion polls.

Verhofstadt voiced concern over the 2006 Lebanon War. Verhofstadt said that Israel has the right to defend itself, but has now responded with excessive violence. On 13 December 2006, a regular programming on the Belgian national television channel La Une was interrupted for a news bulletin claiming that the Flemish parliament had issued a unilateral declaration of independence from the Kingdom of Belgium, mimicking the Belgian secession from the Netherlands some 175 years earlier. The broadcast of the report led to widespread alarm and consternation in French-speaking Belgium and Verhofstadt condemned the report as "irresponsible". In the years coming to the hoax there was rising Flemish separatism and the Vlaams Belang party received strong support in the regional elections. The hoax almost became reality in 2007 after a major political crisis drove many to believe that the partition of Belgium was almost certain.

The Constitutional Court of Belgium ruled that all elections held after 10 June 2007, would be constitutionally invalid because of the non-separation of Brussels-Halle-Vilvoorde. In the autumn of 2005, Verhofstadt managed to score a success when he was able to negotiate a "Generation Pact" with regard to employment and social reforms, regardless of the opposition and actions of the unions. Verhofstadt was sworn in as municipal councilor in Ghent in January 2007, as a result of the 2006 municipal elections. In the council, he is seated next to another cabinet minister, Freya Van den Bossche, who was elected a municipal councillor as well. He even postponed a visit to the Russian president Vladimir Putin to be able to go to the first session of the newly elected council.

=== Verhofstadt III ===
Verhofstadt led the VLD into the 2007 Belgian federal election. Already with the 2006 Belgian local elections, the VLD showed signs of fatigue with the Flemish voter, who seem to have had enough of eight years of Verhofstadt, and the purple coalition governments. In an evening speech on election day, Verhofstadt conceded defeat and asked for a new generation to lead the VLD; he was to step down as prime minister after formation of a new government; however, the 2007 Belgian government formation was complicated, and in the end CD&V politician Yves Leterme failed to bring about a new government.

Yet certain policy matters became politically urgent. The King therefore asked Verhofstadt to mediate an "interim government" that would be in office for three months and could propose a 2008 budget. A deal was struck in December, and the "interim government" was set for inauguration on 21 December 2007. Two days later, this interim government won a vote of confidence in parliament, with 97 votes in favor, 46 opposed, and one abstention, assuring its legitimacy for three months. One of the first decisions of the new government, on 21 December 2007, was to raise the security level after foiling an attempted jail break of an Al Qaeda operative. Belgium was one of the first countries to recognise Kosovo's unilateral declaration of independence on 24 February 2008. A "permanent government" under leadership of Yves Leterme assumed office on 20 March 2008.

=== Senator ===
After his premiership, Verhofstadt took up the seat of Senator to which he had been elected in 2007.

== Member of the European Parliament ==
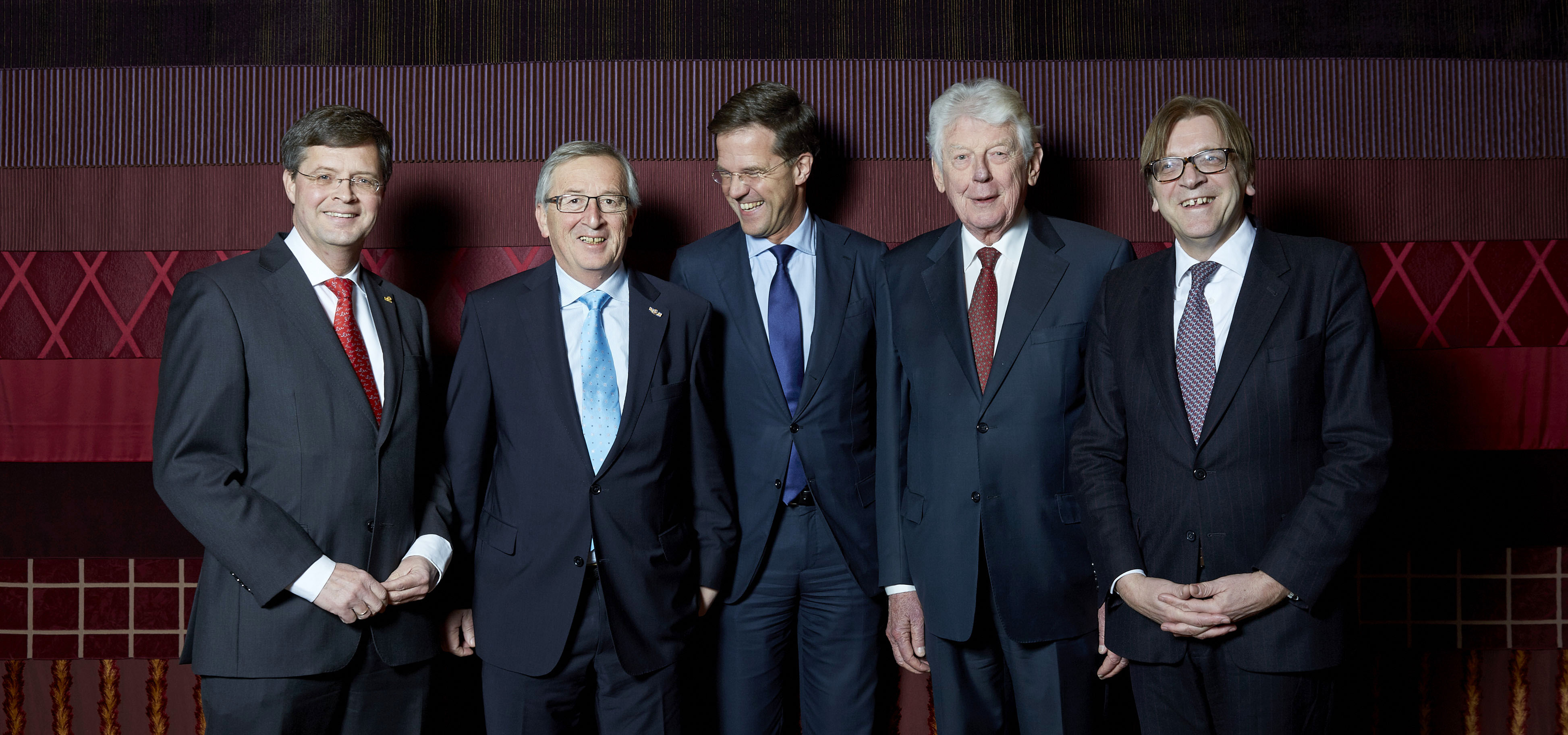
Verhofstadt with Jean-Claude Juncker, Mark Rutte and two former Dutch prime ministers in 2014

In the 2009 European Parliament election in Belgium, Verhofstadt was elected a member of the European Parliament for the term 2009–2014. He has since been appointed to the Committee on Constitutional Affairs. On 1 July 2009, Verhofstadt was elected President of the Alliance of Liberals and Democrats for Europe group in the European Parliament. In this capacity, he was also a member of the Conference of Presidents of the European Parliament until July 2019. In June 2009 Verhofstadt was put forward as the possible candidate for replacing José Manuel Barroso as the president of the European Commission by a coalition of greens, socialists and liberals. On 15 September 2010, he supported the new Spinelli Group, which was founded to reinvigorate the drive for federalisation of the European Union (EU).

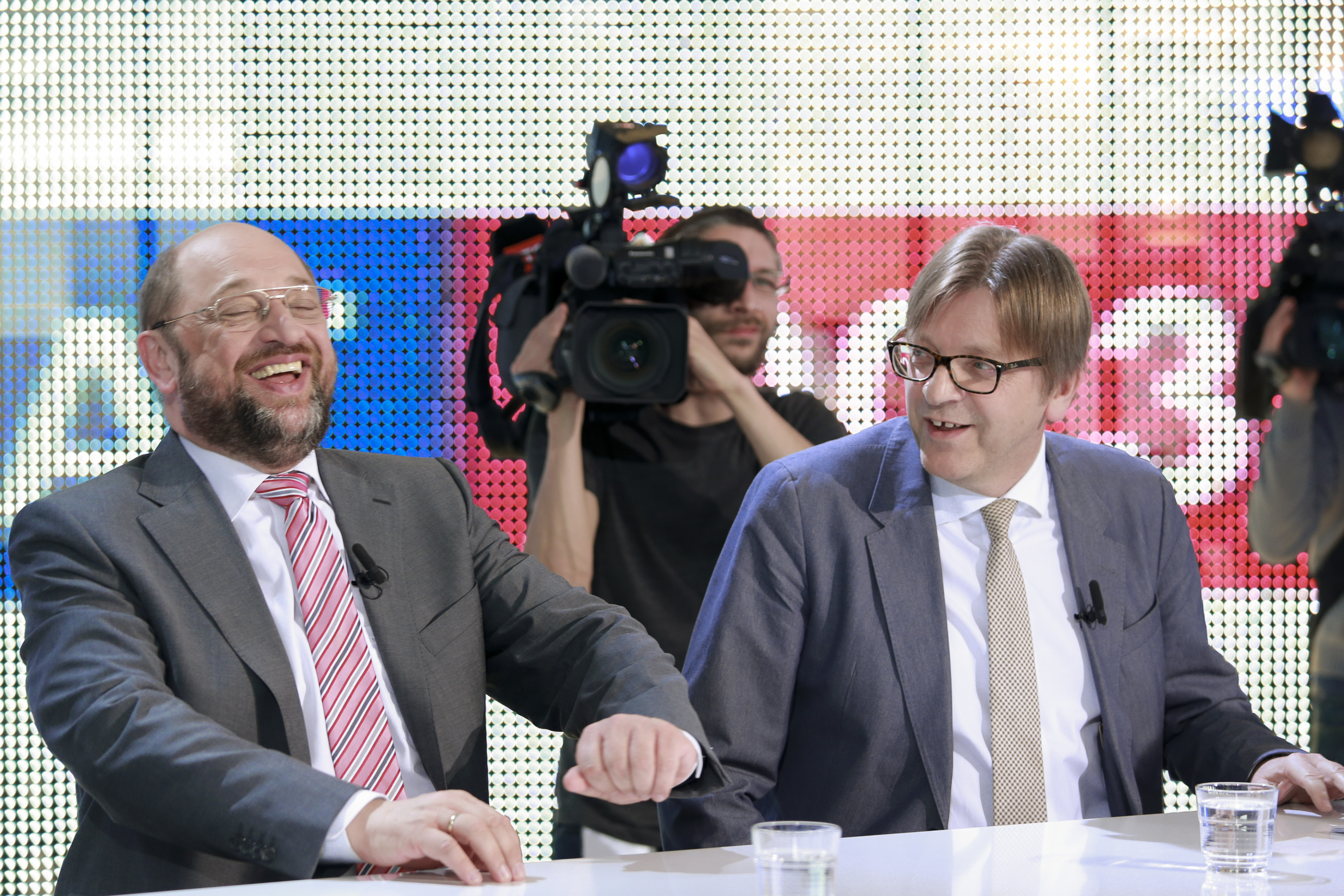
Verhofstadt and Martin Schulz in 2014

In 2010, Belgian Liberal member of the European Parliament and Verhofstadt's close ally Louis Michel called King Leopold II of Belgium, the Congo Free State's colonial master responsible for the deaths of between 3 million and 10 million Congolese Africans, a "visionary hero". Verhofstadt, then leader of the Liberals in the European Parliament, refused to comment on Michel's controversial remarks. In 2014, Verhofstadt contested for the role of Spitzenkandidat against a field that included José Bové, Martin Schulz and eventual winner Jean-Claude Juncker.

In September 2016, Verhofstadt was named the European Parliament's representative on matters relating to Brexit. In his public statements, Verhofstadt has focused on the rights of EU citizens within the UK and British citizens in the EU. In November 2016, Verhofstadt warned the European Parliament of a coming "ring of autocrats", citing the increasing assertiveness of Russia and Turkey, and contemplating the (at that time widely discounted) possibility of a Trump presidency.

From 2019, Verhofstadt was a member of the Working Group on the Conference on the Future of Europe. By 2021, the European Parliament appointed him as its chair to lead the Conference on the Future of Europe. On 8 May 2023, Verhofstadt announced his retirement from politics after the term of the present parliament concluded. On 11 April 2024, Verhofstadt led the Parliament to deny budgetary resources to the European Council because they had not yet found the air defences that were needed by the Ukrainians, as they fought off the Russian forces of Vladimir Putin. He was supported by 515 yeas against 62 nays and the motion passed.

== Other activities ==
=== Corporate boards ===
- APG Asset Management, Member of the Board of Directors
- Sofina, Independent Member of the Board of Directors (since 2012)
- Exmar Group, Independent Member of the Board of Directors (2010–2016)

His income from these activities is estimated to be at least 180,000 euros

=== Non-profit organizations ===
- Berggruen Institute, Member of the Council for the Future of Europe
- Club de Madrid, Member
- European Institute of Public Administration (EIPA), Chairman of the Board of Governors
- European Movement International, Member of the Honorary Council
- Friends of Europe, Member of the Board of Trustees
- European Leadership Network (ELN), Senior Network Member

Since 2011, Verhofstadt has written monthly commentaries on strategic spotlights for Project Syndicate, an international media organization.

== Political positions ==
=== Iraq War ===
Verhofstadt opposed the American-led invasion of Iraq. In 2005, during a meeting with U.S. president George W. Bush, Verhofstadt said: "The time has come to draw a line under the tensions of the recent past. It makes little sense to continue arguing about who was right and who was wrong."

=== Arab–Israeli conflict ===
As prime minister, Verhofstadt supported "ethical diplomacy", international law and multilateralism, as well as Louis Michel's équidistance policy in the Arab–Israeli conflict. Relations with Israel improved after Verhofstadt's government in 2003 weakened the so-called genocide law, under which Ariel Sharon could have been tried in Belgium for the Sabra and Shatila massacre. The 2001 Belgian EU presidency semester was considered cautious on the matter. In 2024, during the Israeli invasion of the Gaza Strip, Verhofstadt called for a "ceasefire now".

=== Bahraini uprising ===
Verhofstadt condemned the killings of protesters during Bahrain's pro-democracy uprising in 2011. He said: "Protestors were killed, tortured and imprisoned. These incidents need to be properly investigated and brought to justice - not swept under the carpet. Until this has happened, I fully agree that the Formula One Grand Prix should not return to Bahrain."

=== Catalan independence ===
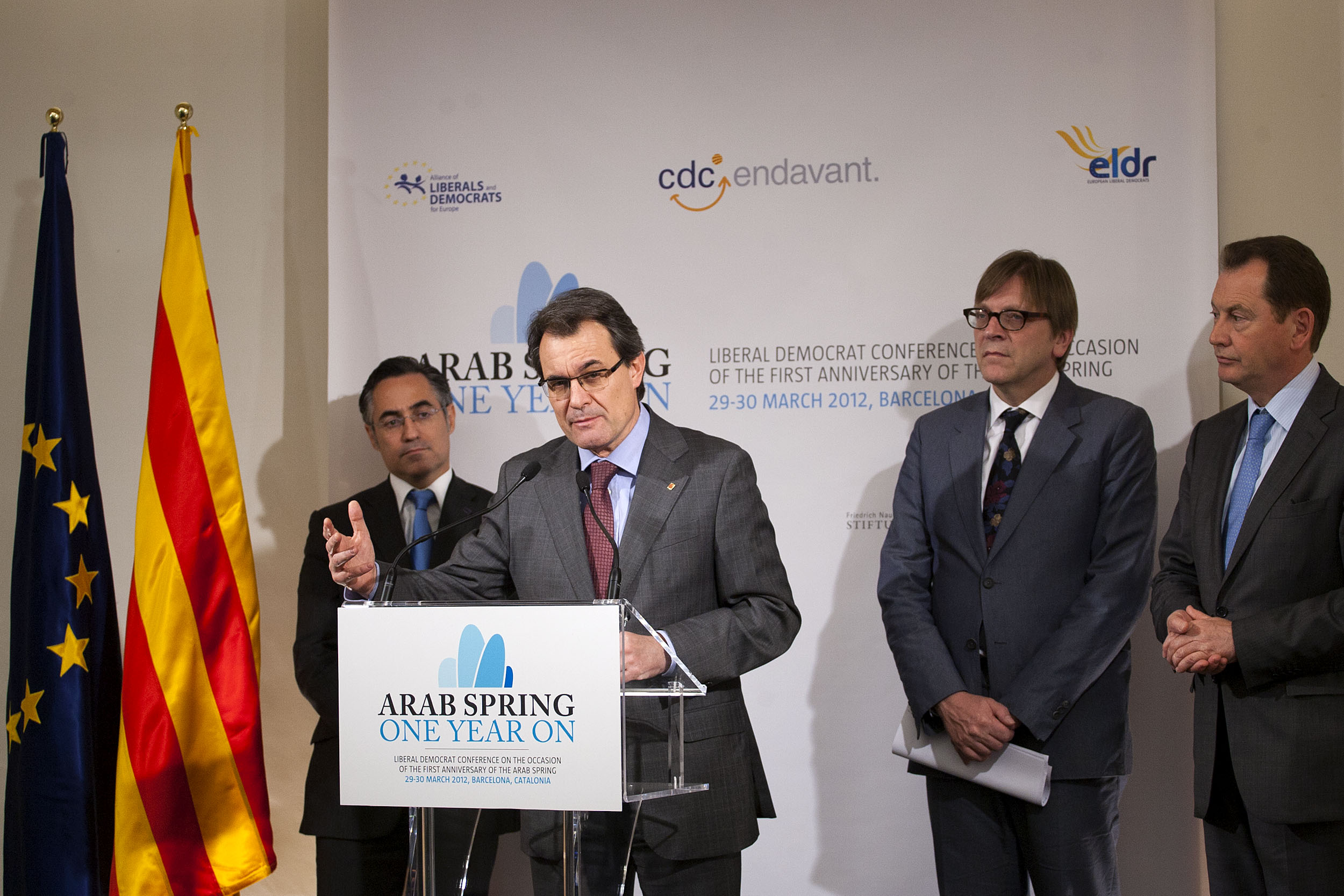
Verhofstadt with Catalonia's leader Artur Mas in 2012

In 2017, Verhofstadt opposed the Catalan independence referendum, but also denounced Spain's use of violence. Verhofstadt said that "referendum lacked basic democratic legitimacy". According to Verhofstadt, the former Catalan president Carles Puigdemont "left Catalonia in chaos and devastation".

=== Russia ===
In April 2015, Verhofstadt criticized Greek prime minister Alexis Tsipras over his meeting with Russian president Vladimir Putin in the wake of the Russo-Ukrainian War and difficult negotiations between the EU/ECB/IMF and Tsipras's recently elected Syriza-led government. Via Twitter according to the New York Times, Verhofstadt said Tsipras "should stop trying to play Putin against the EU" and that Tsipras "should play according to the common rules and conduct serious reforms".

In May 2015, news media reported that Verhofstadt was included in a Russian blacklist of prominent people from the EU who are not allowed to enter the country. In June 2018, Verhofstadt said there was a "circle of evil around our continent", citing Russia under Putin, Turkey under Recep Tayyip Erdoğan, the United States under Donald Trump. Verhofstadt added: "But our problem runs deeper than that, deeper than only foreign policy or external security. Europe has a fifth column in its ranks. ... I call them the cheerleaders of Putin: Le Pen, Wilders, Farage. ... Together with government leaders like Orbán, Kaczyński, Salvini: these people have only one goal and that is to destroy Europe, to kill our liberal democracy."

=== Myanmar ===
On 8 September 2017, Verhofstaft branded Myanmar leader Aung San Suu Kyi "a disgrace" following her controversial comments about the Rohingya genocide in Myanmar.

=== Turkey ===
In November 2016, Verhofstadt said: "There is broad, broad majority in the house to say you have to freeze accessions talks for the moment and put a number of conditions to restart them once Turkey is compliant." In May 2017, he accused Turkish president Recep Tayyip Erdoğan of cynicism for advocating freedom of speech while journalists are imprisoned in Turkey.

=== Migration ===
In August 2015, Verhofstadt called for a reform of the EU's asylum and migration system, in reaction to the European migrant crisis. He also criticised UK prime minister David Cameron and French president François Hollande for opposing the European Commission's proposal to distribute asylum requests for migrants over all countries of the EU. He also called on governments of France, the UK, and Hungary to stop building up walls and border security measures, and to shift their effort on humanitarian assistance. This humanitarian assistance includes asking the dysfunctional countries that source migrants to address their own dysfunction.

=== European federalism ===
Following the results of 2005 European Constitution referendum in France and The Netherlands, Verhofstadt released his book Verenigde Staten van Europa (United States of Europe), calling for a federal Europe. Written in Dutch, the book argues (based on the results of a Eurobarometer questionnaire) that the average European citizen wants "more Europe". In September 2019, Verhofstadt gave a speech at the conference of the Liberal Democrats in Bournemouth, saying that "the world of tomorrow is not a world order based on nation states or countries. It is a world order that is based on empires. China, is not a nation, it's a civilisation. India is not a nation. The US is also an empire, more than a nation. And then finally the Russian Federation. The world of tomorrow is a world of empires in which we Europeans, and you British, can only defend your interests, your way of life, by doing it together, in a European framework and in the EU."

=== Brexit ===
In January 2013, three years before the 2016 United Kingdom European Union membership referendum, Verhofstadt said that Brexit was "stupidity for a country with 53 percent of its exports going to the Continent and to the rest of Europe. It's even so stupid that Britain's best friends, the United States, don't understand it all." In February 2016, in the run-up to the Brexit referendum, Verhofstadt said "The only winners from a Brexit would be Nigel Farage and Vladimir Putin; who would relish a divided Europe." In July 2016, Verhofstadt said "Politically, the UK is already on its way to becoming an adversary, rather than a trusted partner, of the EU... Theresa May actually opposed Brexit, yet her anti-European hostility differs only in degree, not in kind, from that of pro-Brexit politicians… who rejoice at the possibility of additional exit referenda across the EU."

In October 2017, Verhofstadt claimed that Northern Ireland was stuck in a "frozen conflict". He said: "There are fences 12 metres high and this is in the 21st Century." In a Twitter post on 13 June 2018, Verhofstadt accused Nigel Farage of using "Kremlin money and claimed Aaron Banks "colluded with the Russians to deliver Brexit". Lawyers, on behalf of Banks, issued Verhofstadt with a legal letter and said the allegations "are false". In February 2019, Verhofstadt said that Brexit leaders such as Boris Johnson and Jacob Rees-Mogg would suffer a similar fate to the leaders of the French Revolution and "end up on the guillotine".

In May 2019, Verhofstadt made public a private joke between him and the UK's chief negotiator, Olly Robbins, in which Robbins "joked that he would want EU citizenship after Brexit". On 10 May 2019, Verhofstadt joined anti-Brexit supporters in London. He said "We have to stop nationalism and populism the fastest as possible because otherwise, it could be the end of a fantastic project". On 25 July 2019, Verhofstadt branded UK prime minister Johnson's vow to take the UK out of the EU on 31 October as "irresponsible" due to the possibility of a no-deal Brexit. In September 2019, Verhofstadt attacked the words used by UK prime minister Johnson during the Brexit process, calling it "the language of Europe's dark past". In 2023, Verhofstadt re-iterated his criticisms of Brexit, stating that it paved the path for the 2022 Russian invasion of Ukraine. According to Verhofstadt, Putin would have been more wary of invading if there was a more united Europe, especially on defence matters.

== Honours and awards ==
=== Belgian honours ===
- Belgium: Minister of State, by Royal decree.
- Belgium: Grand Cordon in the Order of Leopold, 21 April 2008.
- Belgium: Grand Cross in the Order of the Crown, 5 June 2007.

=== Foreign honours ===
- Denmark: Grand Cross of the Order of the Dannebrog, 2002.
- Finland: Grand Cross of the Order of the White Rose of Finland, 30 March 2004.
- Greece: Grand Cross of the Order of Honour, 2005.
- Italy: Knight Grand Cross of the Order of Merit of the Italian Republic, 20 February 1986.
- Norway: Grand Cross of the Royal Norwegian Order of Merit, 2003.
- Poland: Grand Cordon of the Order of Merit of the Republic of Poland, 14 October 2004.
- Spain: Knight Grand Cross of the Order of Isabella the Catholic, 2000.
- Sweden: Commander Grand Cross of the Royal Order of the Polar Star, 2001.

=== Other honors and awards ===
- European Union: Verhofstadt received the European Book Prize for United States of Europe in 2007.
- European Union: Verhofstadt received the Outstanding Achievement award at The Parliament Magazine's annual MEP Awards in 2019.

== See also ==
- Crown Council of Belgium
- Dirk Verhofstadt, his brother
- United States of Europe

Political offices
| Preceded by Jean-Luc Dehaene | Prime Minister of Belgium; 1999–2008 | Succeeded by Yves Leterme |
Party political offices
| Preceded by Graham Watson | Leader of the Alliance of Liberals and Democrats for Europe in the European Parliament; 2009–2019 | Succeeded by Dacian Cioloș as Leader of Renew Europe |
