= Timiș County =

County of Romania

Timiș County Județul Timiș
- County
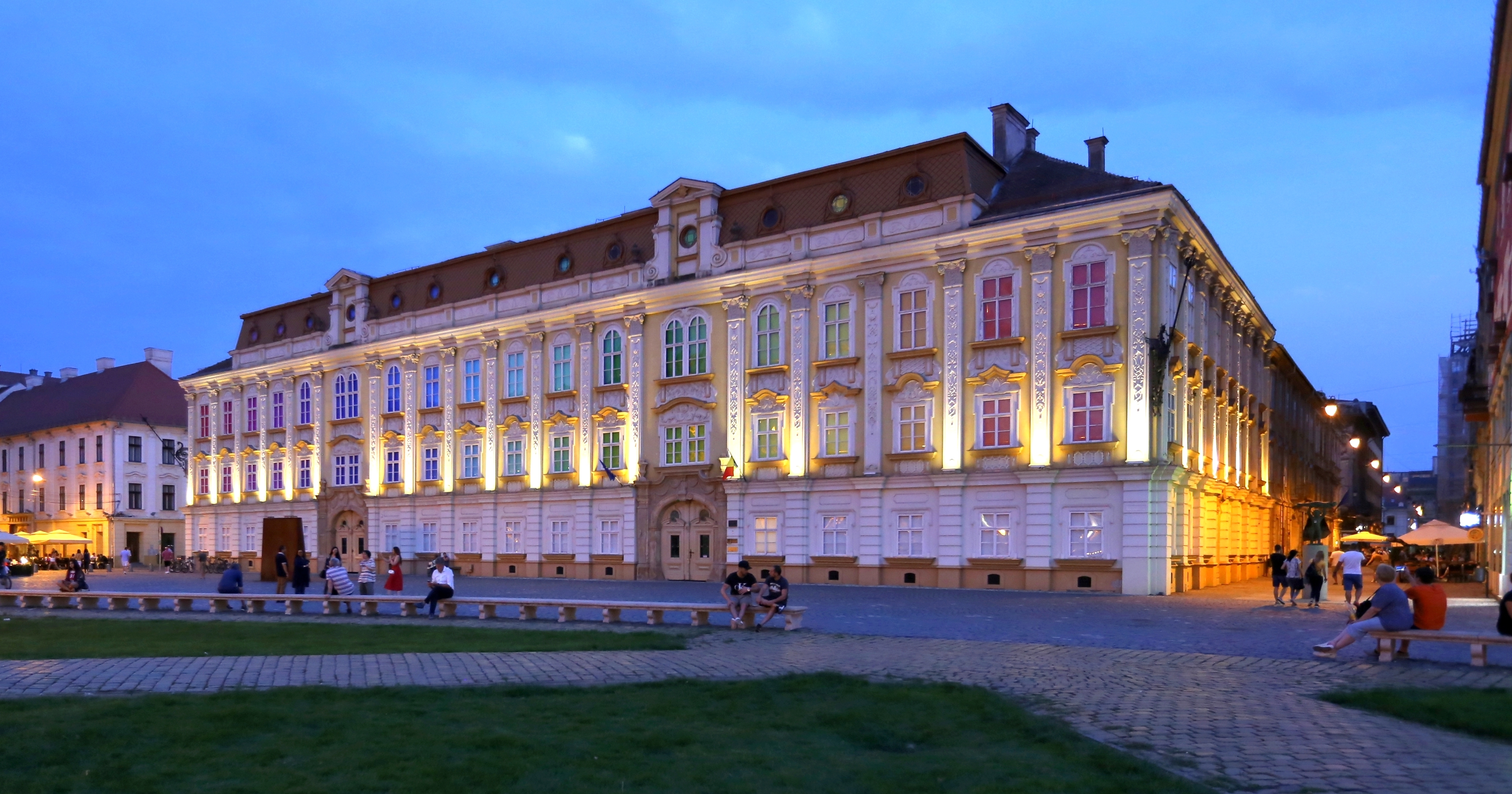
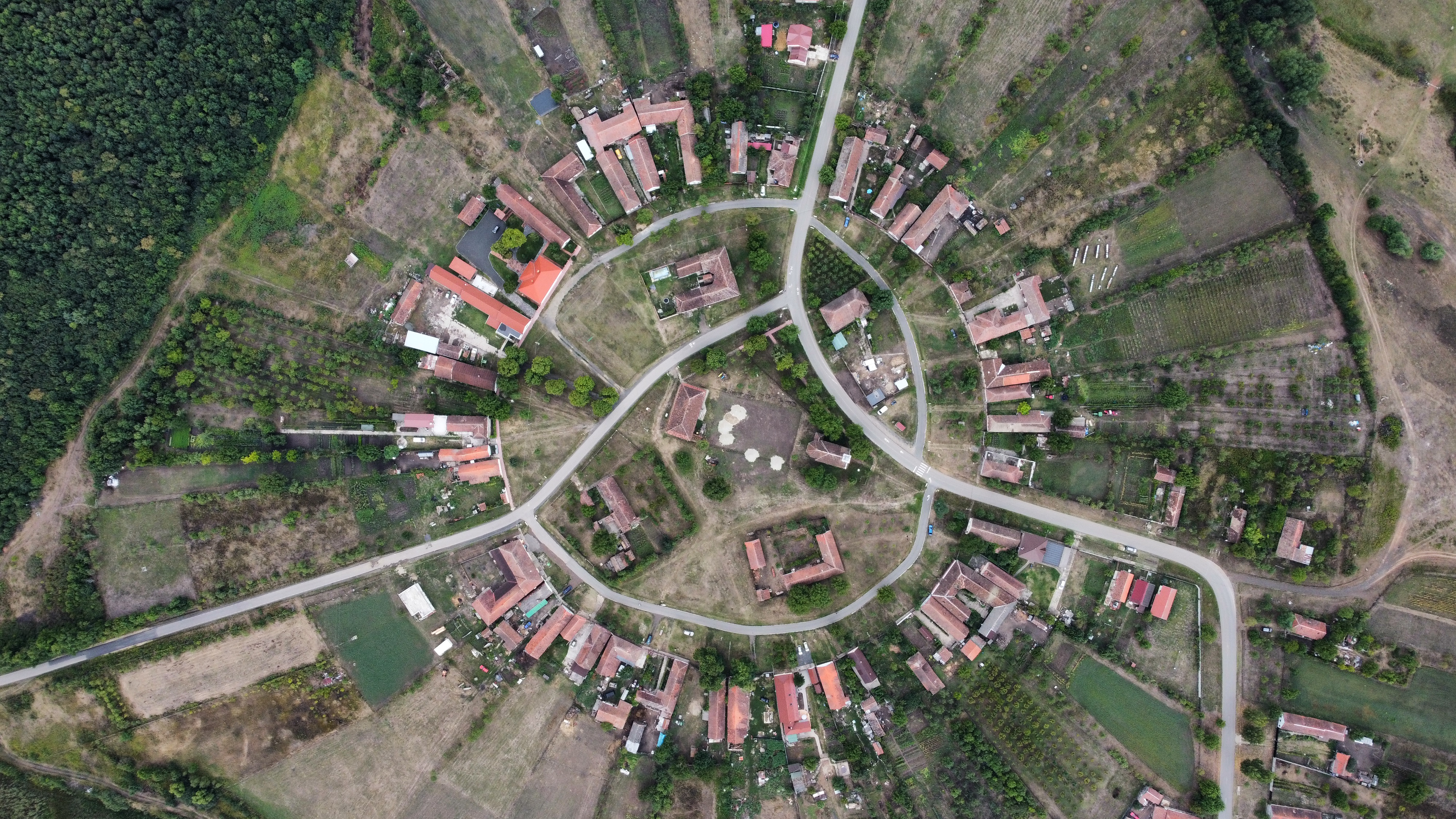
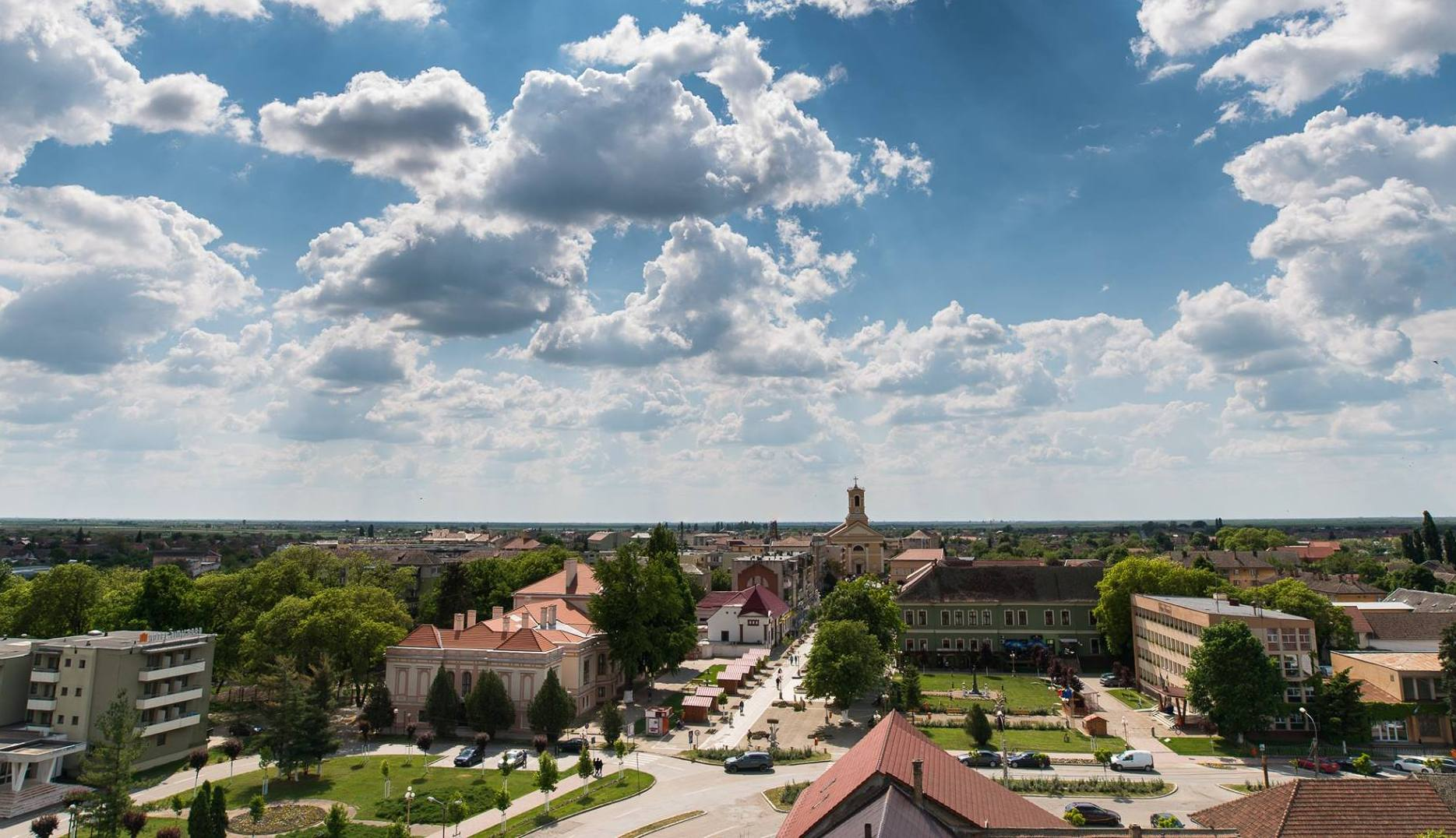
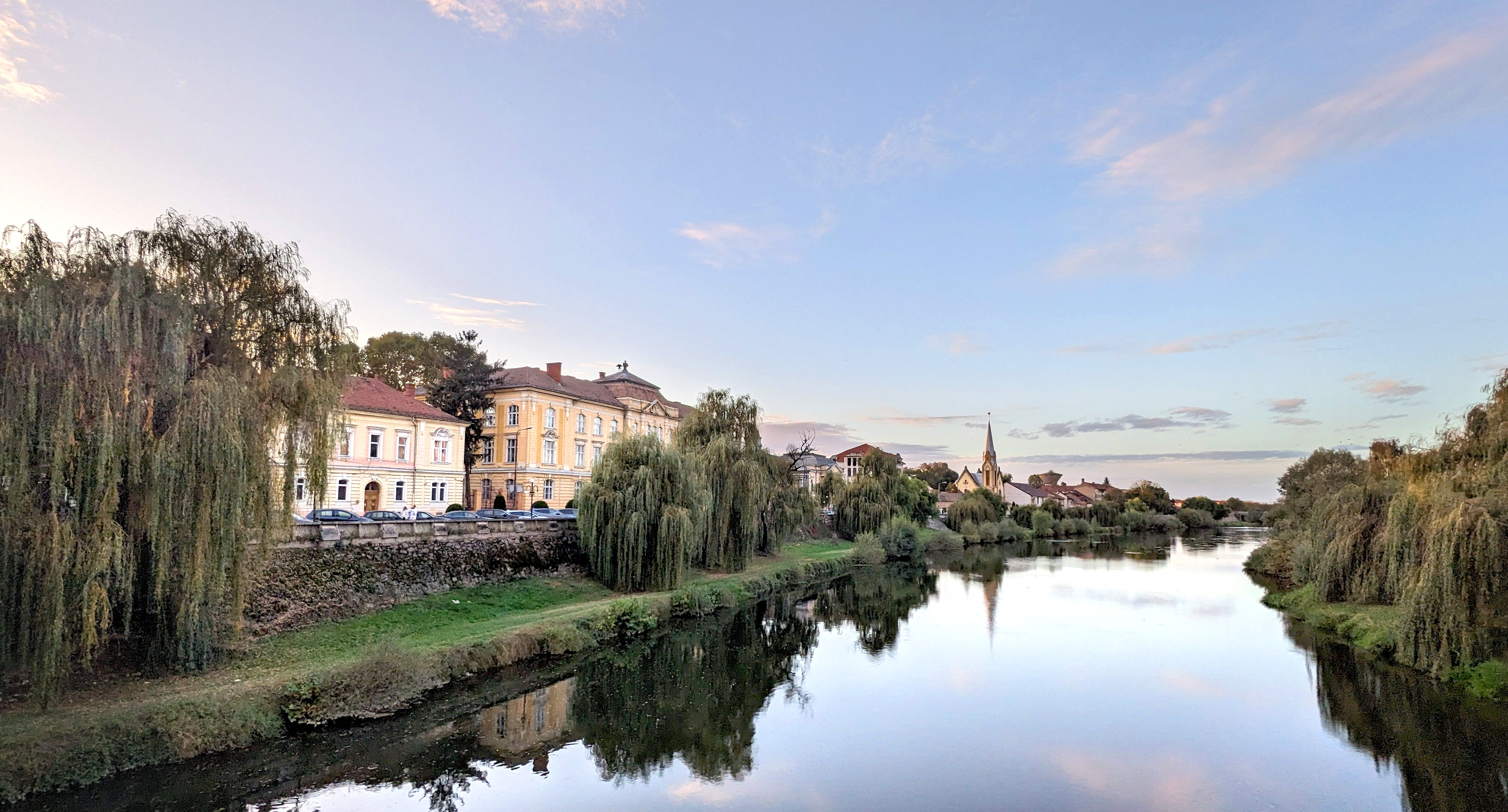
- Baroque Palace, Timișoara Charlottenburg Sânnicolau Mare Lugoj

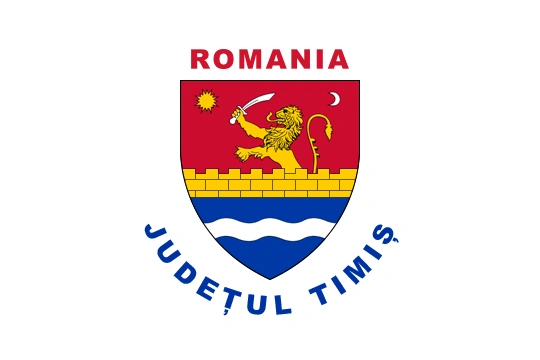
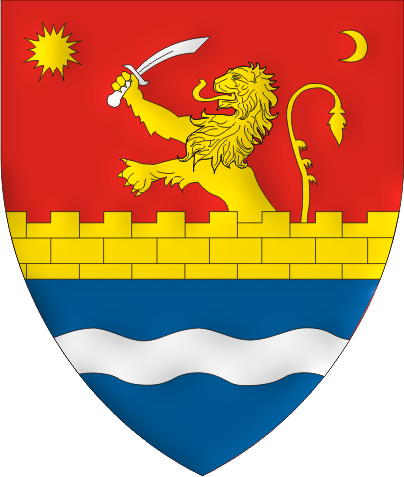
- Flag Coat of arms
- Etymology: Timiș River
- Location of Timiș County in Romania
- Interactive map of Timiș County
- Coordinates: 45°41′34.08″N 21°24′19.8″E
- Country: Romania
- Historical region: Banat
- Development region: West
- Established: 1968
- County seat: Timișoara

Government
  - Body: Timiș County Council
  - President: Alfred Simonis (PSD)
  - Prefect: Cornelia Micicoi (USR)

Area
  - Total: 8,696.7 km^{2} (3,357.8 sq mi)
  - Rank: 1st
  - Rank: 6th
- Demonym(s): timișean (male), timișeană (female)
- Time zone: UTC+2 (EET)
  - Summer (DST): UTC+3 (EEST)
- SIRUTA code: 350
- Registration plate: TM
- GDP (nominal): US$ 19.390 billion (2026)
- GDP per capita: US$ 29,964 (2026)
- Website: County Council; County Prefecture

Timiș (Romanian pronunciation: [ˈtimiʃ]) is a county (județ) of western Romania on the border with Hungary and Serbia, in the historical region of Banat, with the county seat at Timișoara. It is the westernmost and the largest county in Romania in terms of land area. The county is also part of the Danube–Criș–Mureș–Tisa Euroregion.

== Name ==
The name of the county comes from the Timiș River, known in Roman antiquity as Tibisis or Tibiscus. According to Lajos Kiss' etymological dictionary, the name of the river probably comes from the Dacian language: thibh-isjo ("marshy"). In Hungarian, Timiș County is known as Temes megye, in German as Kreis Temesch, in Serbian as Тамишки округ/Tamiški okrug, in Croatian as Tamiška županija, in Ukrainian as Тімішський повіт, and in Banat Bulgarian as okrug Timiš.

== Geography ==

Timiș is the largest county in Romania, occupying 8,696.7 km^{2}, i.e. 3.65% of the country's area. It is crossed by the 46th parallel north, the 21st meridian east and the 22nd meridian east. On its territory is the westernmost point of Romania, i.e. Beba Veche, at 20° 15′ 44″, in the Triplex Confinium point.

Timiș County is part of the West Development Region along with the counties of Arad, Caraș-Severin and Hunedoara, being located in the center of the historical province of Banat. Due to its geographical position, almost a third of the county's borders are at the same time state borders. Thus, in the northwestern part, it borders Csongrád-Csanád County (Hungary), 18 km of this border being on the Mureș River. To the southwest, between Beba Veche and Lățunaș, Timiș County borders Serbia. The land connection with the counties of the neighboring countries is ensured by the border crossing points from Cenad, Moravița and Jimbolia. The neighboring Romanian counties with Timiș County are Arad to the north, Hunedoara to the east and Caraș-Severin to the southeast.

=== Neighbours ===
- Caraș-Severin County to the Southeast.
- Hunedoara County to the East
- Arad County to the North.
- Hungary to the Northwest - Csongrád-Csanád County.
- Serbia to the Southwest - South Banat District, Central Banat District and North Banat District.

=== Relief ===
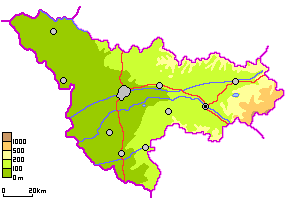
Physical map of Timiș County

The relief is characterized by the predominance of plains, which cover the western part (low plain) and the central part (high plain) of the county. Timiș County features all landforms, with altitudes between 75 m in Banat Plain and 1,374 m in Poiana Ruscă Mountains. Proportionally, the plain covers about 6,700 km^{2}, representing 77.2% of the county's area; the hills cover about 1,650 km^{2}, i.e. 19.01%; and the mountains cover a relatively small area of 300 km^{2}, i.e. 3.45%.

The plain penetrates in a gulf-like manner the hilly areas, on the valleys of Timiș (towards Lugoj) and Bega (towards Făget). In the east of the county lie the pre-mountain hills of Buziaș and the southern sector of the Lipova Plateau, whose peaks rise to altitudes between 200 and 400 m. The hills of Lăpugiu, Făget, Lugoj, Lipova, Silagiu and Sacoș are rich in pastures, orchards of fruit trees, vineyards, but also in cereal crops. The relief in the eastern part of the county is dominated by the Poiana Ruscă Mountains, with deep valleys and steep slopes, with heights that rarely exceed 1300 m (Padeș peak – 1374 m, Rusca peak – 1355 m).

Geographical features of Timiș County
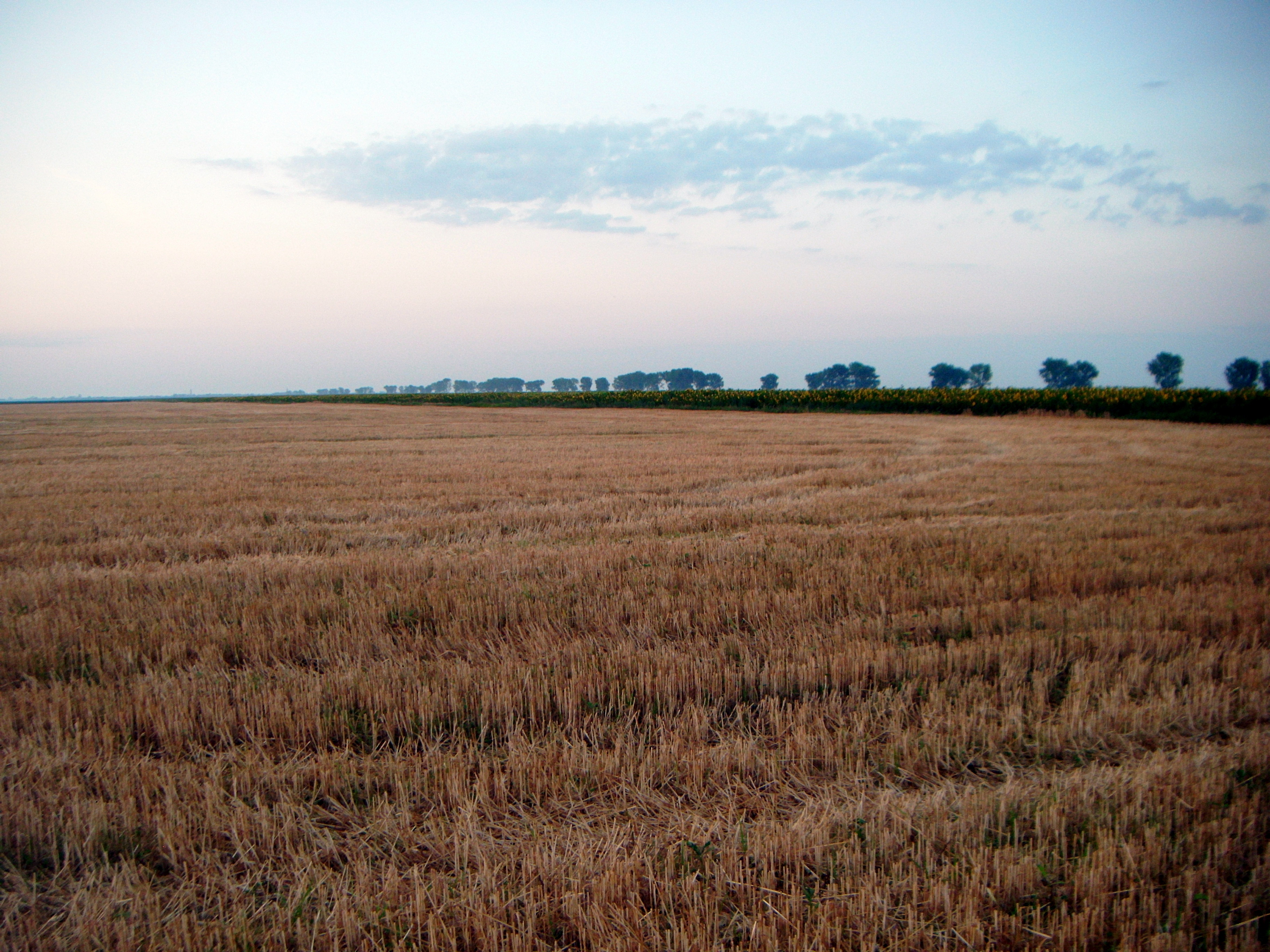
Agricultural landscape in Aranca Plain

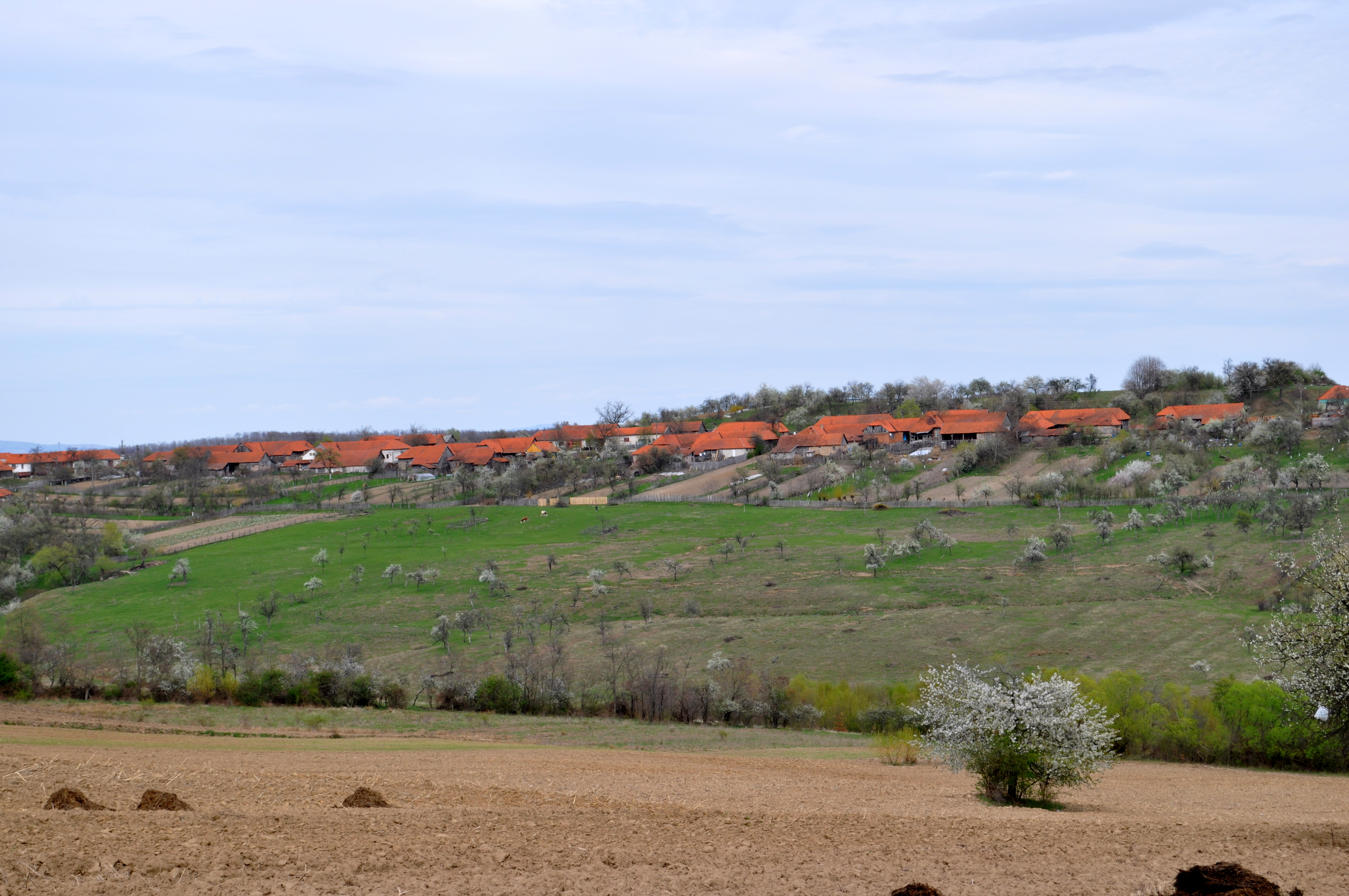
Lipova Plateau

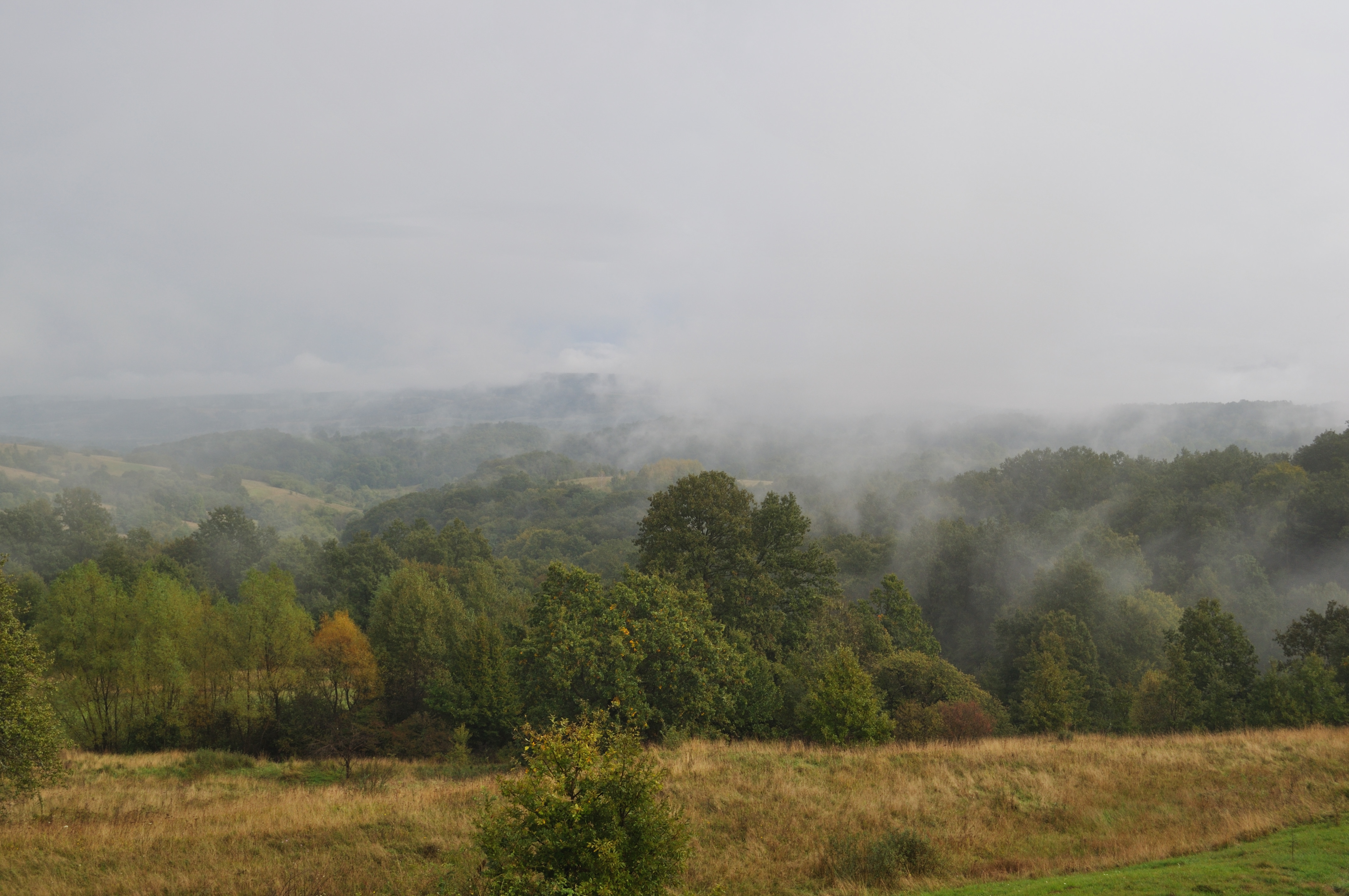
Poiana Ruscă Mountains

=== Natural resources ===
Located in the southeastern part of the Pannonian Plain, the subsoil of Timiș County there are deposits of lignite (Sinersig), basalt (Lucareț–Șanovița), manganese (Pietroasa), clay (Biled, Cărpiniș, Jimbolia, Lugoj and Sânnicolau Mare), crude oil and gas (in the western part of the county), sand (Șag) and glass sand (Groși–Făget, Tomești and Gladna Montană). Mineral waters are also exploited in Buziaș, Călacea, Ivanda, Bogda and Timișoara. The soil of Timiș County offers extremely favorable conditions for the cultivation of agricultural plants, especially for the cultivation of cereals, but also for technical and fodder plants, as well as for fruit growing and viticulture. The forests are relatively few. In the eastern part there are forests of fir, spruce and beech. In the other parts of the county there are small forests of oak, Austrian oak, Hungarian oak, and in the meadows – poplars and willows.

=== Hydrography ===
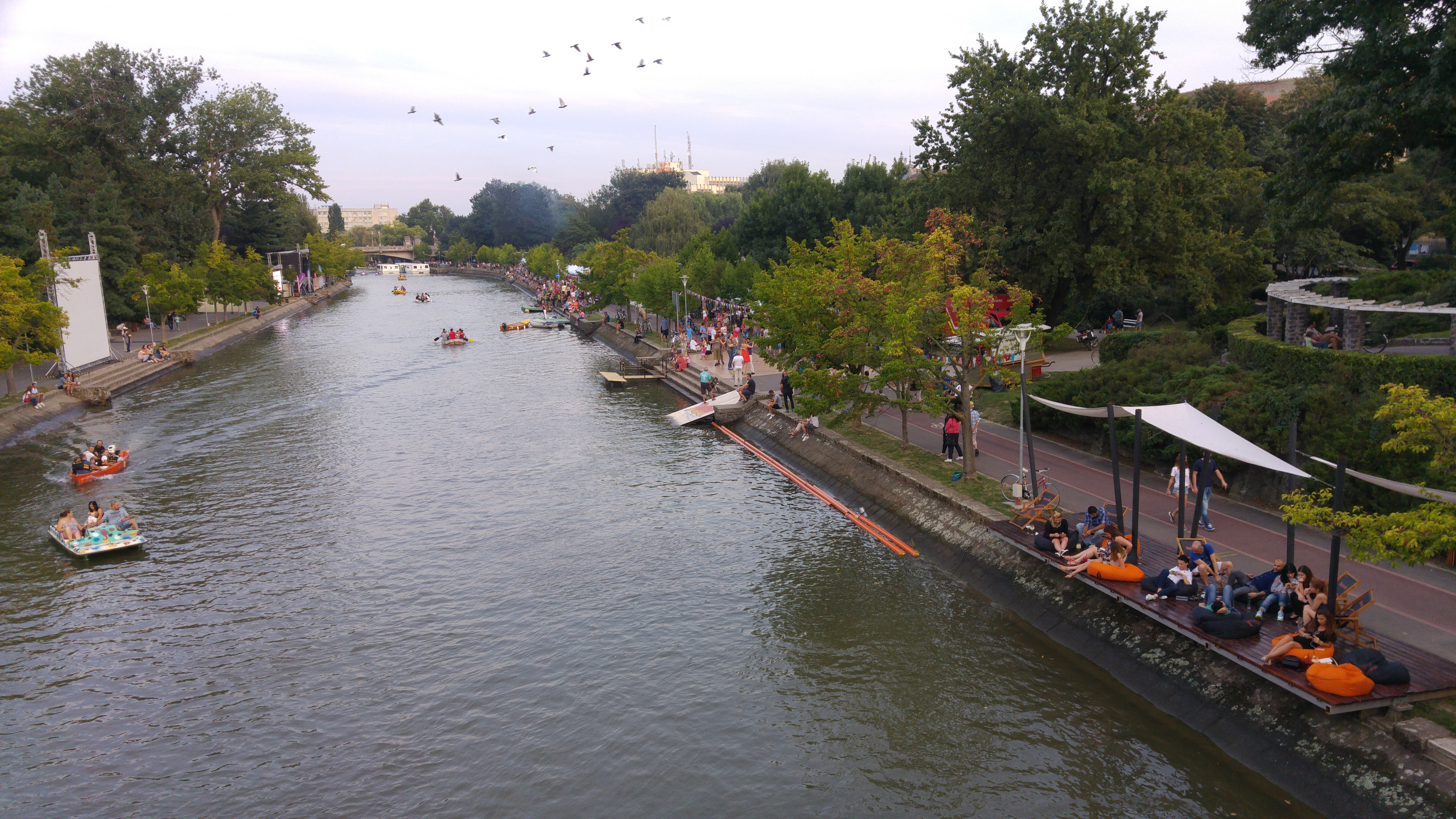
Bega River in Timișoara

The hydrographic network of Timiș County, spread over 3,104 km, is composed of two hydrographic basins: Bega–Timiș–Caraș and Mureș. The most important rivers in size and hydropower potential in the county, which cross the territory through the center, dividing it into two halves, south and north, are Timiș and Bega. Timiș is the largest inland river in Banat, which has its sources on the eastern slopes of the Semenic Mountains, in Caraș-Severin County. The river is formed at the confluence of three branches: Semenic, Grădiște and Brebu. It crosses the whole of Timiș County, then passes into Serbia where it flows into the Danube, to Pančevo. Bega River springs from the Poiana Ruscă Mountains and flows into the Tisza after a route of 244 km, being its southernmost tributary. Downstream, towards the western edge, up to the border, the course of the Bega River is completely canalized. The Bega Canal is navigable both in Romania and in Serbia, having a length of 44 km only in Romania.

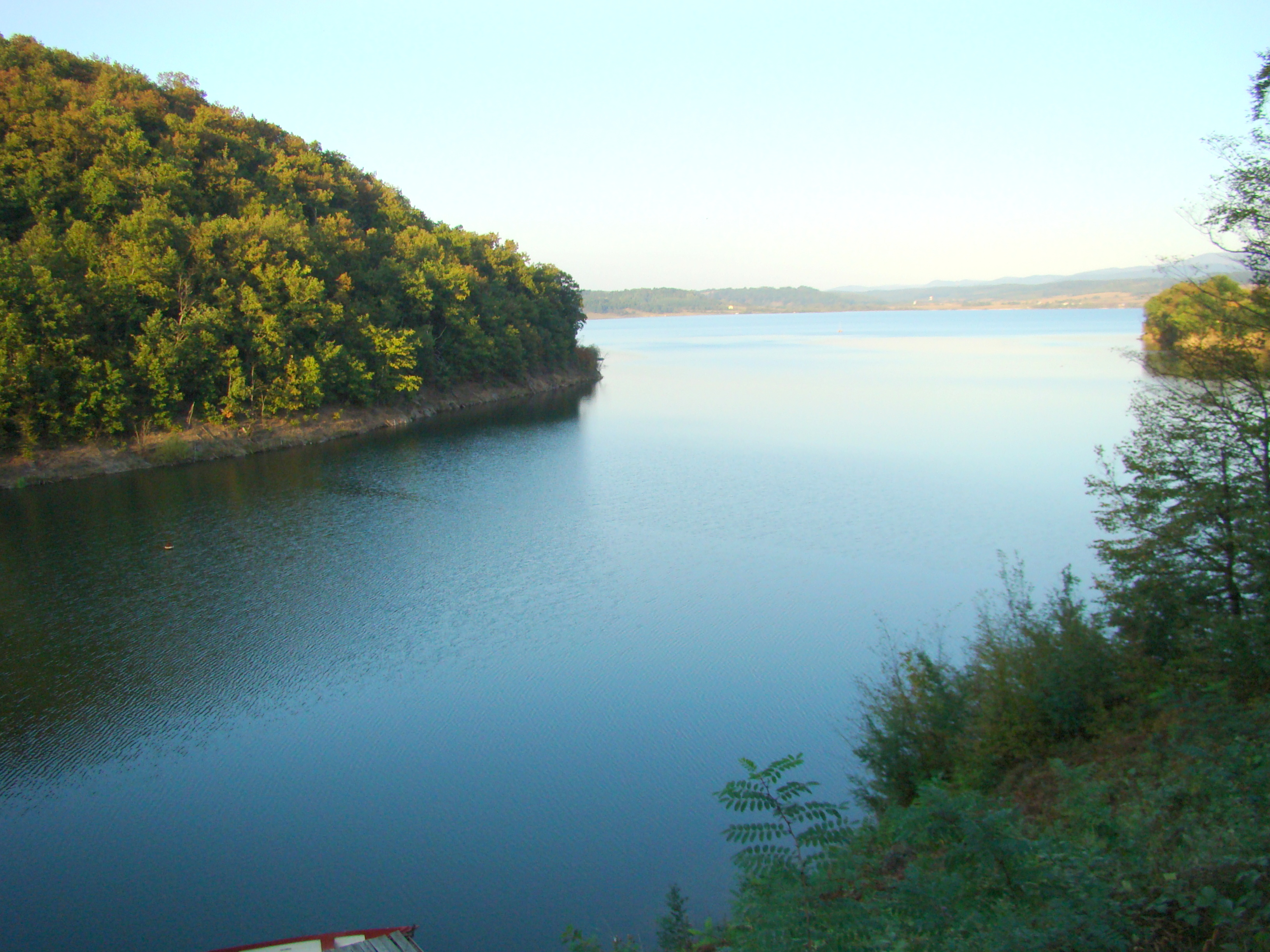
Lake Surduc

The natural lakes, with small areas and depths, are represented by the lake complex of Satchinez (40 ha; 1.5 m deep), the two lakes of Becicherecu Mic (one of 33 ha and another of 13 ha), the Petra pond of Jebel, etc. Between 1969 and 1975, pond-like lakes for flood control, irrigation and fishing were arranged on the courses of both Timiș and Bega. The largest of these, Lake Surduc, was arranged on Gladna stream, a tributary of the Bega, and has an area of 460 ha and a volume of 51 million m^{3}. In the county there are also two lakes with hot (20 °C) and mineral water at Românești, with an area of 50 m^{2} and the muddy volcano from Ohaba-Forgaci, in the Magheruș valley, of 50 m^{2}.

The high density of the hydrographic network, the low slopes of the riverbeds in the plain sector, the reduced depth of the groundwater, the presence of ultisols, all favor the floods and marshes. To reduce the amplitude of these phenomena, since the first half of the 18teenth century, large engineering works (damming, canalization, draining etc.) were made in the region, most of which are still functional today. Among the major flash floods and floods in the Banat Plain, the most important were those of May 1912, June 1966 and April 2005.

=== Flora ===
The natural vegetation, strongly influenced by human activities, is characterized by the small-scale presence of forest-steppe plants and by a higher frequency of hydro- and hygrophilous vegetation in low plains and meadows with excess moisture. The extensive agricultural crops in the plain alternate with small areas of secondary meadows dominated by fescue associations (Festuca valesiaca, Festuca rupicola and Festuca pseudovina) mixed with wormwood (Artemisia austriaca) and others. The deciduous forests, made up of pedunculate oak (Quercus robur), Austrian oak (Quercus cerris) and Hungarian oak (Quercus frainetto), occupy insularly or on compact areas the Lipova Plateau, the Lugoj and Pogăniș Hills and partly the Gătaia Plain. In the eastern extremity of Timiș County there are sessile oak forests (Quercus petraea) mixed with Austrian oak (Quercus cerris), beech forests (Fagus sylvatica) mixed with hornbeam (Carpinus betulus), and the upper slopes of the Poiana Ruscă Mountains are covered with spruce forests mixed with fir and beech.

In Timiș County there are 45 nature reserves that total 134,766.49 ha or about 13% of the county's area.

=== Fauna ===
The fauna, adapted to the relief and vegetation conditions, includes steppe species (hares, ground squirrels, polecats, field mice, moles, rollers, quails, partridges, larks, starlings, lizards, various insects), forest species (roe deer, squirrels, bears, wolves, foxes, wild boars, wildcats, dormice, jays, salamanders, etc.) and water species (herons, mallards, geese, storks, frogs and a wide variety of fish, such as pike, barbel, Prussian carp, wels, perch, carp, etc.).

=== Climate ===
The climate has a moderate temperate continental character, with hot summers and mild winters due to both the influences of the oceanic (from the west) and Mediterranean (from the south and southwest) air masses and the fact that over 85% of the territory belongs to the plain climate (the remaining 15% belongs to the climate of hilly and mountainous regions). The western area of the Banat Plain is classified according to Köppen's guide as Cfa, and the mountainous area in the east of the county as Dfb. Due to the high uniformity of the relief, the average annual temperatures are poorly differentiated on the territory of Timiș County. The annual averages are close to 11 °C in the region with plain climate and decrease by 1–2 °C on the hills in the east of the county. The averages of the warmest month (July) exceed 21 °C in the plain and fall below 18 °C in the east. The averages of the coldest month (January) are higher than –2 °C in the plain and rise to values higher than –1 °C in the east of the county. The absolute maximum temperature (42 °C) was recorded in Banloc (24 July 2007), and the absolute minimum temperature (–35.3 °C) in Timișoara (29 January 1963).

The average multiannual precipitation amounts to increasing quantities from west to east, i.e. 569 mm in Jimbolia, 620.6 mm in Timișoara, 734 mm in Făget and over 1,200 mm on the ridges of the Poiana Ruscă Mountains. The maximum rainfall occurs in June, as a result of the intensification of cyclonic activity in the North Atlantic or in the Mediterranean basin. On the other hand, the lowest average monthly amounts fall in February–March. The snow layer is unstable and has insignificant thicknesses.

Predominant winds blow from the north (16.9%), east (15%), northwest (9.1%) and south (8.4%), with average annual speeds between 1.2 and 3.8 m/s. Local winds include austru (dry wind from the south), coșavă (high-speed cold wind), rușavăț (in the Banat Plain) and mountain breezes (in the east).

Characteristic parameters of the topoclimates of Banat
Territory		Plain		Hills	Mountains
Topoclimate		Low plain	High plain	Banat Hills	Poiana Ruscă
Average annual temperature (°C)		10…11	10…11	8…11	2…6
Average temperature (°C) in	January	>–2	<–2	<–3	–4…–6
Average temperature (°C) in	July	>21	20…21	18…19	14…17
Average annual amplitude (°C)		>23	22…23	21…22	20…21
No. of days with frost		<90	<90	100…110	>180
No. of days without frost		190	180…190	160…180	120…160
No. of tropical days		>40	30…40	20…30	<5
Average annual rainfall (mm)		<600	600…700	800…1,000	>1,200
No. of days with snow cover		<40	40…50	50…75	75…100
Relative humidity in July (%)		<64	<64	<64…>72	72…80
No. of clear days		>60	>60	>50	40…50

== Demographics ==
Ethnic composition of Timiș County (2021)
1. Romanians (74.4%)
2. Hungarians (3.27%)
3. Romani (1.19%)
4. Serbs (0.99%)
5. Germans (Banat Swabians) (0.72%)
6. Ukrainians (0.64%)
7. Bulgarians (0.50%)
8. Slovaks (0.14%)
9. Others (17.4%)
Religious composition of Timiș County (2021)
1. Romanian Orthodox (79.1%)
2. Roman Catholics (7.66%)
3. Pentecostals (5.13%)
4. Baptists (1.57%)
5. Reformed (1.28%)
6. Serbian Orthodox (1.04%)
7. Greek Catholics (0.98%)
8. Others (1.47%)
9. Irreligious, atheists and agnostics (1.73%)

According to the 2021 census, Timiș County had a population of 650,533 (or 3.4% of the country's population), being the sixth most populous county in Romania. The population density was 74.8/km^{2} (193.7/sq mi).

Timiș County has an urbanization rate of 61.8%, above the national rate but decreasing amid an expanding suburbanization.

Historical population

Year	Pop.	±%
1880	454,145	—
1890	502,582	+10.7%
1900	541,849	+7.8%
1910	560,258	+3.4%
1920	512,891	−8.5%
1930	559,591	+9.1%
1944	578,881	+3.4%

Year	Pop.	±%
1956	568,881	−1.7%
1966	607,596	+6.8%
1977	696,884	+14.7%
1992	700,033	+0.5%
2002	677,926	−3.2%
2011	683,540	+0.8%
2021	705,270	+3.2%

Source data

Census		Ethnic group								
Year	Population	Romanians	Hungarians	Germans	Jews	Roma	Ukrainians	Serbs	Slovaks	Bulgarians
1880	454,145	200,834 (44.2%)	33,947 (7.5%)	171,539 (37.8%)	—N/a	—N/a	64 (<0.1%)	31,316 (6.9%)	3,549 (0.8%)	—N/a
1890*	502,582	211,748 (42.1%)	45,998 (9.2%)	195,588 (38.9%)	—N/a	—N/a	49 (<0.1%)	31,467 (6.3%)	2,869 (0.6%)	—N/a
1900*	541,849	221,305 (40.8%)	70,338 (13%)	201,795 (37.2%)	—N/a	—N/a	69 (<0.1%)	30,939 (5.7%)	2,911 (0.5%)	—N/a
1910*	560,258	223,816 (39.9%)	96,364 (17.2%)	188,440 (33.6%)	—N/a	—N/a	296 (0.1%)	32,430 (5.8%)	3,269 (0.6%)	—N/a
1920	512,891	217,056 (42.3%)	74,324 (14.5%)	168,605 (32.9%)	11,779 (2.3%)	—N/a	—N/a	—N/a	—N/a	—N/a
1930	559,591	236,305 (42.2%)	84,756 (15.1%)	178,238 (31.9%)	9,768 (1.7%)	8,090 (1.4%)	1,399 (0.3%)	27,075 (4.8%)	3,919 (0.7%)	7,527 (1.3%)
1941	578,881	263,474 (45.5%)	74,745 (12.9%)	176,732 (30.5%)	—N/a	—N/a	—N/a	—N/a	—N/a	—N/a
1956	568,881	325,834 (57.3%)	77,530 (13.6%)	114,194 (20.1%)	7,378 (1.3%)	6,089 (1.1%)	1,405 (0.2%)	23,781 (4.2%)	2,667 (0.5%)	7,440 (1.3%)
1966	607,596	378,183 (62.2%)	76,183 (12.5%)	109,315 (18%)	2,909 (0.5%)	4,637 (0.8%)	1,780 (0.3%)	22,709 (3.7%)	2,300 (0.4%)	7,509 (1.2%)
1977	696,884	472,912 (67.9%)	77,525 (11.1%)	98,296 (14.1%)	1,799 (0.3%)	9,828 (1.4%)	3,773 (0.5%)	20,891 (3%)	2,128 (0.3%)	7,151 (1%)
1992	700,033	561,200 (80.2%)	62,866 (9%)	26,722 (3.8%)	625 (0.1%)	14,836 (2.1%)	6,468 (0.9%)	17,144 (2.4%)	2,229 (0.3%)	6,466 (0.9%)
2002	677,926	565,639 (83.4%)	50,556 (7.5%)	14,174 (2.1%)	441 (0.1%)	16,084 (2.4%)	7,321 (1.1%)	13,273 (2%)	1,908 (0.3%)	5,562 (0.8%)
2011	683,540	550,836 (80.6%)	35,295 (5.2%)	8,504 (1.2%)	220 (<0.1%)	14,525 (2.1%)	5,950 (0.9%)	10,344 (1.5%)	1,424 (0.2%)	4,478 (0.7%)
2021	650,533	484,243 (74.44%)	21,285 (3.27%)	4,684 (0.72%)	144 (0.02%)	12,438 (1.91%)	4,131 (0.64%)	6,447 (0.99%)	939 (0.14%)	3,244 (0.5%)
*Censuses in italics are based on mother tongue and not ethnicity.

According to the 2011 census, Hungarians are the largest ethnic minority in Timiș County, numbering 35,295 people or 5.2% of the county's population. Significant concentrations of the Hungarian population follow the areas where the policy of colonization of the Kingdom of Hungary manifested itself in the 19th century and the beginning of the 20th century. At the 2011 census, there were 16 localities – all rural – that had at least 20% Hungarian population. However, their total population represents only 12.6% of the Hungarian population in the county. This is explained by the migration of Hungarians from rural to urban areas after 1990. By weight, the largest Hungarian communities are found in Otelec (Ótelek; 75.1%), Cherestur (Pusztakeresztúr; 69.7%), Bodo (Nagybodófalva; 64%), Tormac (Végvár; 60.6%) and Otvești (Ötvösd; 52.6%).

Roma are the second largest minority, with 14,525 people (or 2.1% of the county's population) at the 2011 census, although unofficial estimates put the figure at 45,000. Măguri, a component locality of Lugoj municipality, is the only village in the county where the Roma have an absolute majority (69.4% in 2011).

The largest communities of Serbs, Germans and Bulgarians in Romania also live in Timiș County. The number of Serbs living in Timiș exceeds 10,000. Most of them are located in Timișoara and in the localities near the border with Serbia: Cralovăț (Краљевац/Kraljevac; 64.5%), Petrovaselo (Петрово Село/Petrovo Selo; 48.4%), Sânmartinu Sârbesc (Српски Семартон/Srpski Semarton; 35.6%), Cenei (Ченеј/Čenej; 24.2%), Diniaș (Дињаш/Dinjaš; 21.8%), etc. Up to the 20th century, the Germans (specifically Banat Swabians) were a very large community. They were colonized here at the end of the 17th century and during the 18th century, in three successive waves, during the reigns of Charles VI, Maria Theresa and Joseph II. They came from different areas of Germany, especially Rhineland, the Palatinate and Swabia, but also Luxembourg, Lorraine, Alsace, Westphalia, Hesse, East Franconia and Bavaria. Deported to the Soviet Union for forced labor after 1945 and subjected to nationalization and collectivization during the communist period, most Germans in Timiș County left for Germany and Austria, with one last wave after 1990. At present, they account for merely 1/24 of the number at the 1900 census, when the highest number of Germans was recorded. Banat Bulgarians, a Bulgarian Catholic minority, began settling in Banat in the late 17th century from the north and northwest of today's Bulgaria. The largest communities of Banat Bulgarians in Timiș County live in Breștea (Brešća; 80.3%), Dudeștii Vechi (Stár Bišnov; 66.5%) and Denta (Dénta; 5.2%).

=== Religion ===
In Timiș County there are over 300 places of worship. Timisoara is the seat of the Archbishopric of Timișoara, the see of the Metropolis of Banat. The archbishopric has jurisdiction over the territory of Timiș County, which is divided into 273 parishes organized in six deaneries (Timișoara I, Timișoara II, Lugoj, Făget, Deta and Sânnicolau Mare). Timișoara is also the seat of the Roman Catholic Archbishopric of Timișoara and the Serbian Orthodox Diocese of Timișoara and one of the nine deaneries of the Reformed Eparchy of Piatra Craiului. Lugoj is the seat of the Greek Catholic Archbishopric of Lugoj and one of the two deaneries of the Ukrainian Orthodox Vicarage.

== Politics and administration ==
Timiș County is administered by a county council (consiliu județean) consisting of 36 councilors. Following the 2024 local elections, the council is chaired by Alfred Simonis from PSD, and the political composition of the council is as follows (the political composition indicated is that by parties, not by electoral alliances that participated in the local elections, as was the case of PSD-PNL Alliance or United Right Alliance between USR, FD and PMP):

Party	Seats	Current County Council
National Liberal Party (PNL)	10	
Social Democratic Party (PSD)	10	
Save Romania Union (USR)	5	
Alliance for the Union of Romanians (AUR)	5	
Force of the Right (FD)	5	
People's Movement Party (PMP)	1	

== Administrative divisions ==
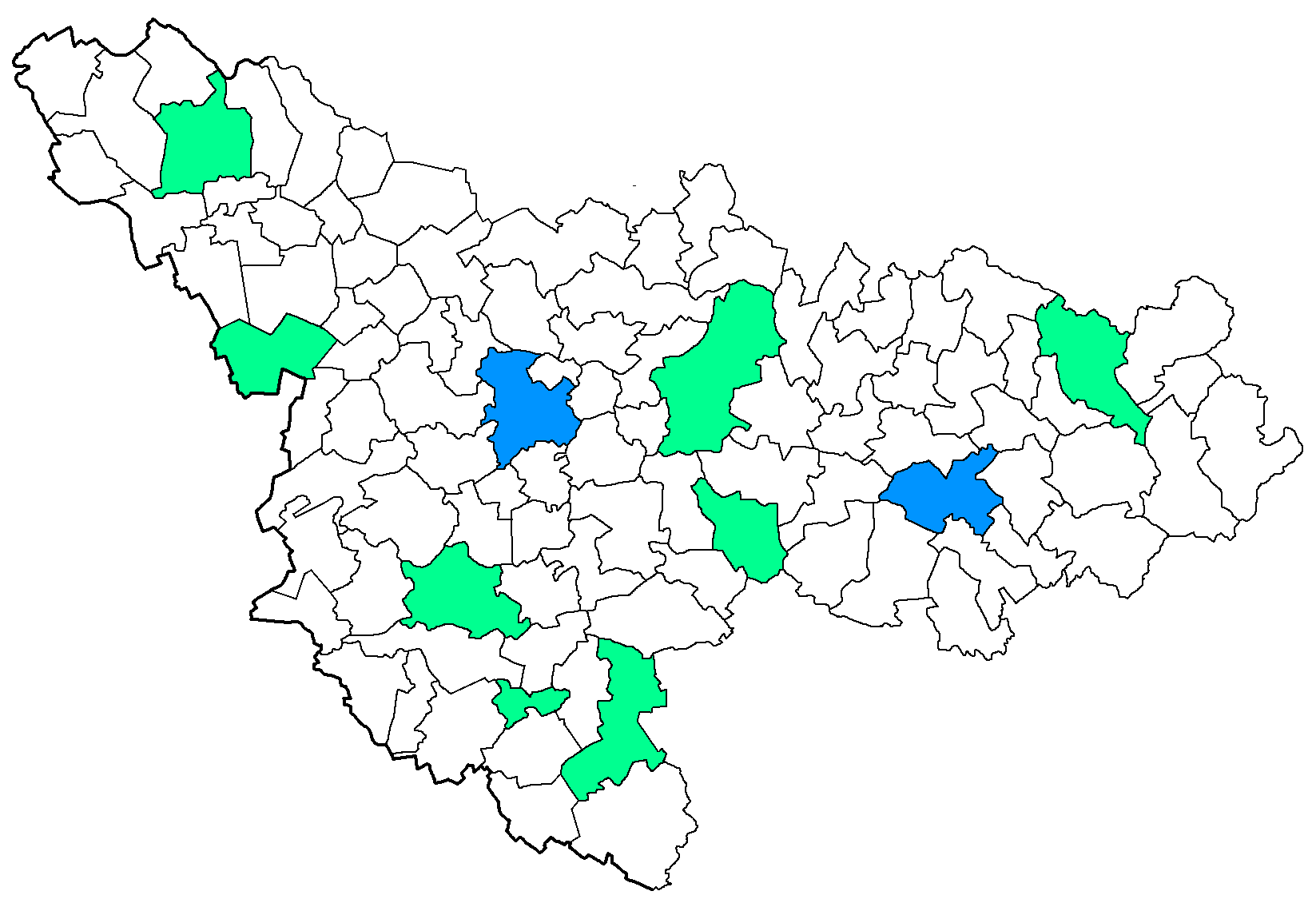
Administrative map of Timiș County Municipality Town

Timiș County is divided into two municipalities (municipiu), eight towns (oraș) and 89 communes (comună) with 313 villages:

Municipalities

- Timișoara – county seat; population: 319,279 (as of 2011)
- Lugoj – population: 40,361 (as of 2011)

Towns

- Sânnicolau Mare – population: 12,312 (as of 2011)
- Jimbolia – population: 10,808 (as of 2011)
- Recaș – population: 8,336 (as of 2011)
- Buziaș – population: 7,023 (as of 2011)
- Făget – population: 6,761 (as of 2011)
- Deta – population: 6,260 (as of 2011)
- Gătaia – population: 5,861 (as of 2011)
- Ciacova – population: 5,348 (as of 2011)

Communes

- Balinț
- Banloc
- Bara
- Bârna
- Beba Veche
- Becicherecu Mic
- Belinț
- Bethausen
- Biled
- Birda
- Bogda
- Boldur
- Brestovăț
- Bucovăț
- Cărpiniș
- Cenad
- Cenei
- Checea
- Chevereșu Mare
- Comloșu Mare
- Coșteiu
- Criciova
- Curtea
- Darova
- Denta
- Dudeștii Noi
- Dudeștii Vechi
- Dumbrava
- Dumbrăvița
- Fârdea
- Fibiș
- Foeni
- Gavojdia
- Ghilad
- Ghiroda
- Ghizela
- Giarmata
- Giera
- Giroc
- Giulvăz
- Gottlob
- Iecea Mare
- Jamu Mare
- Jebel
- Lenauheim
- Liebling
- Livezile
- Lovrin
- Margina
- Mașloc
- Mănăștiur
- Moravița
- Moșnița Nouă
- Nădrag
- Nițchidorf
- Ohaba Lungă
- Orțișoara
- Otelec
- Parța
- Pădureni
- Peciu Nou
- Periam
- Pesac
- Pietroasa
- Pișchia
- Racovița
- Remetea Mare
- Sacoșu Turcesc
- Saravale
- Satchinez
- Săcălaz
- Sânandrei
- Sânmihaiu Român
- Sânpetru Mare
- Secaș
- Șag
- Șandra
- Știuca
- Teremia Mare
- Tomești
- Tomnatic
- Topolovățu Mare
- Tormac
- Traian Vuia
- Uivar
- Variaș
- Vălcani
- Victor Vlad Delamarina
- Voiteg

=== Official symbols ===
The flag of Timiș County has a rectangular shape, with its width equal to two-thirds of its length and consists of the county coat of arms superimposed on a white background. White chosen for the flag signifies purity and peace. Above the coat of arms is inscribed in capital letters in vermilion the word "Romania", and below it is inscribed with the same characters in cobalt blue the words "Timiș County". The county flag was approved in 2021.

The coat of arms was approved in 2002 and consists of a cut shield; at the top, on the red field, a golden lion coming out of the battlements of a wall of built gold; the lion holds a bent sword, with a wide point, made of silver; in the upper right-hand corner is a golden sun, and in the upper left, a rising silver moon. At the bottom, on the blue field, is a wavy silver band. The lion with armed arm, characteristic of Banat of Temeswar, symbolizes the defenders of the land and of Christianity against the Ottoman armies; the lion carries the victorious sword of Pál Kinizsi, Count of Temes County. The gold wall symbolizes the fortress of Timișoara. The golden sun symbolizes, through its position, the lofty goals for which the heroes of this land fought. The silver moon represents the pair of the sun. The wavy silver band on the blue field symbolizes the Timiș River, which gives the county its name.

Historical variants

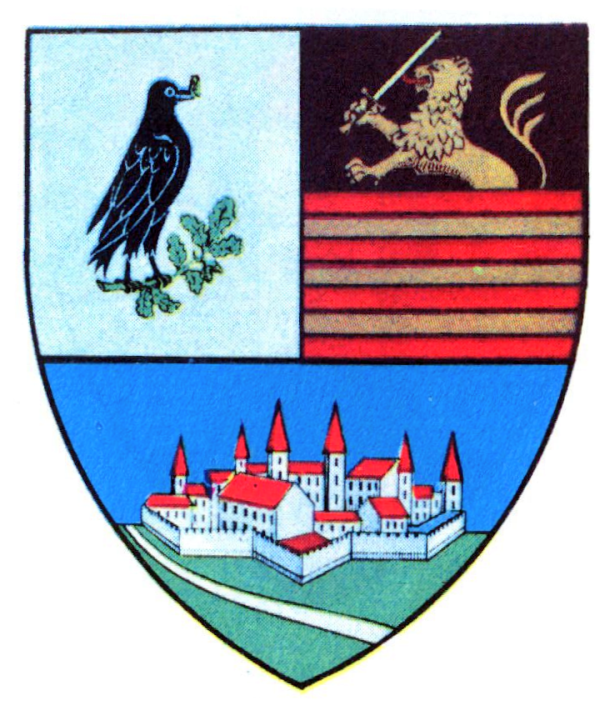
In the interwar period

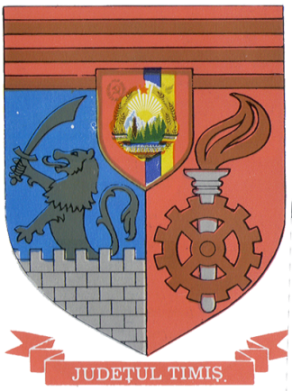
During the communist period

== Economy ==
Timiș County has one of the most dynamic economies in Romania. The county's economy gradually transformed from a predominantly industrial one, sometimes with significant losses due to the non-use of labor and capital endowments, into a tertiary one (based mainly on services). The specialization of Timiș County stands out in the computer, automotive and electrical equipment industry, these registering high values of the location quotient (as of 2019).

In 2021, Timiș County had a GDP per capita of 31,519 euros, 40% above the national average, and an annual growth rate of 5–10%. At national level, it ranks third in terms of GDP, reaching 62.5 billion lei in 2021, with a contribution of 6.5% of Romania's total GDP, having a developed economy and among the highest entrepreneurial rates in the country (36 SMEs per 1,000 inhabitants in 2019). The most important sector represented locally is the automotive industry, supported by large companies such as Continental, Delphi Packard, Hella, Mahle, Dräxlmaier, Flex, etc. In recent years, certain high tech know-how-intensive services, such as IT&C, have seen strong growth. Timiș has one of the lowest unemployment rates in the country – 0.8% in 2019. Most employees are in manufacturing (27%), trade (15.2%) and agriculture (15.1%).

Timiș stands out as the second business pole at national level, after Bucharest–Ilfov, with a turnover of companies of 72 billion lei, which constitutes about 5% of the turnover of 1,400 billion lei of all companies in Romania. The county's exports stood at over 39.05 billion lei, Timiș being among the few counties in the country with a positive trade balance. Timiș County's exports consist mainly of the following groups of goods: electrical machines, appliances and equipment (37%), plastics and rubber (14%), means of transport (11%), footwear (9%), optical instruments and appliances (7%), furniture (5%). Timiș County is also the largest importer of consumer goods, after Bucharest.

=== Industry ===
The industry of Timiș County is strong and diversified, due to the high rate of greenfield and brownfield investments, the western location of the county, the high qualification of the labor force, as well as the entrepreneurial tradition. The most significant share in the total production of the county is held by the manufacturing industry, having as sub-branches: electronics industry, food industry, chemical industry, textile industry, metal and wood processing industry and construction. Although with only 8% of the number of companies in Timiș, the manufacturing industry registers a turnover of 40% of the county's total.

=== Agriculture ===
Timiș County ranks first in the country in terms of both agricultural and arable land. Timiș County has an agricultural area of 691,299 ha, of which 531,472 ha is arable land, 118,671 pastures, 28,632 hayfields, 4,121 vineyards and vine nurseries and 8,403 orchards and fruit nurseries.

One of the oldest and most important agricultural activities in the county, with favorable climatic conditions, is the cultivation of cereals and technical plants, and viticulture is practiced in most of the communes in the plain and hill area of the county. Places like Recaș, Buziaș and Giarmata are renowned for their wine production. The production of vegetables in individual micro-farms is also a traditional economic activity, especially in the rural localities in the vicinity of urban centers. By cultivated area, the main crops are maize (165,643 ha), wheat and rye (133,657 ha), sunflower (78,242 ha), perennial fodder (38,060 ha) and soybeans (21,200 ha). Livestock farming is also an important, traditional branch of Timiș agriculture, and in recent years there has been a significant increase in the number of animals in the private sector. As of 2019, livestock in Timiș County consisted of 1,524,625 birds, 612,638 sheep, 605,619 swine, 45,332 bee families, 37,305 cattle, 21,890 goats and 5,659 horses.

Unlike industry, trade and construction, which also generates a large part of the gross value added (GVA) of the county economy, agriculture stands out with a very high share of employment correlated with a low share in GDP (5%), although that it places the county on the first place at national level from the perspective of the GVA obtained in agriculture.

=== Banking ===
With several units of national and international banks operating here (BCR, Raiffeisen Bank, BT, BRD, CEC Bank, OTP Bank, UniCredit Bank, Alpha Bank, Citibank, Credit Europe Bank, Garanti BBVA, ING Bank, Intesa Sanpaolo Bank, etc.), Timiș County is a national leader in the field of financial intermediation. As of 2021, the turnover of companies with financial and insurance activities was 69 million euros in Timișoara alone.

=== Tourism ===
The geographical position of the county in the immediate vicinity of the border with Hungary and Serbia leads to a high transit tourism, but with short and medium length of stay. The main form of tourism practiced in the county is business tourism, followed by recreational, shopping and gastronomic tourism. The tourist infrastructure of Timiș County consists of 56 hotels, 14 hostels, two motels, a campsite, four tourist villas, 49 tourist pensions, 27 agritourism pensions and two camps for students and preschoolers with an accommodation capacity of 7,746 places. In 2019, Timiș County had 396,644 tourists, of which 30% were foreigners.

Cultural-historical tourism includes many objectives in historical and archeological sites, architectural monuments and museums. Timișoara has the largest architectural ensemble of historic buildings in Romania (about 14,500), consisting of the urban heritage of the Cetate, Iosefin, Fabric and Elisabetin districts. In addition, there are 31 castles and mansions in Timiș County. Notable are the Swabian-specific localities in the western Banat Plain (Jimbolia, Sânnicolau Mare, Șandra, Lovrin, Lenauheim, etc.), in the past important settlements of colonists from the German lands of the Habsburg Empire. Religious tourism includes many places of worship, churches and historic monasteries. Among the monastic ensembles are the historic wooden churches in Țara Făgetului, all built after the liberation of Banat from Ottoman occupation (1716), the 11th-century Morisena Monastery (the first monastery in Romania), the 14th-century Partoș Monastery with the relics of St. Joseph of Partoș, the 15th-century Săraca Monastery, the 15th-century Serbian Orthodox St. George Monastery of Birda, the 18th-century Cebza Monastery and, more recently, the Izvorul Miron Monastery (1912; nicknamed the "Voroneț of Banat") and the Timișeni Monastery (1944).

Ecotourism is practiced mainly in the mountainous area in the east of the county, where Lake Surduc is located (the largest lake in western Romania), but also a series of waterfalls and caves. Areas with a rich hunting fund, as well as those with a diversified fishing fund are suitable for sport hunting and fishing. On the territory of Timiș County there are 86 hunting funds and 30 fishing funds. Canoeing and kayaking can be practiced on the Bega Canal, and rafting on the Timiș River. Spa tourism is practiced in Buziaș (declared a spa resort in 1911), Timișoara, Deta, as well as Călacea, Teremia Mare and Lovrin. Wine tourism is represented by the Recaș–Buziaș area, renowned both in the country and abroad for its wines.

Tourist attractions in Timiș County
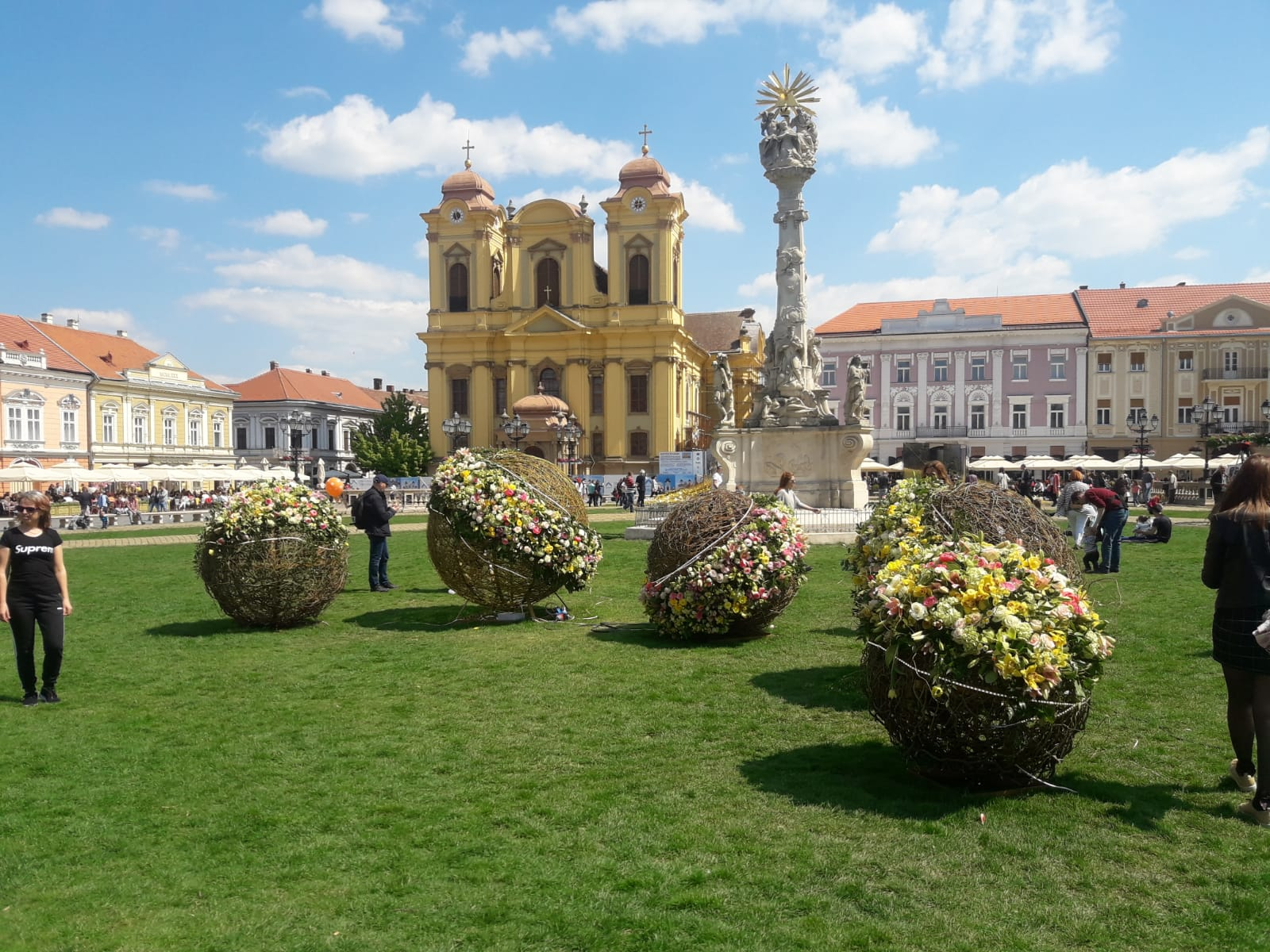
Historic centre of Timișoara

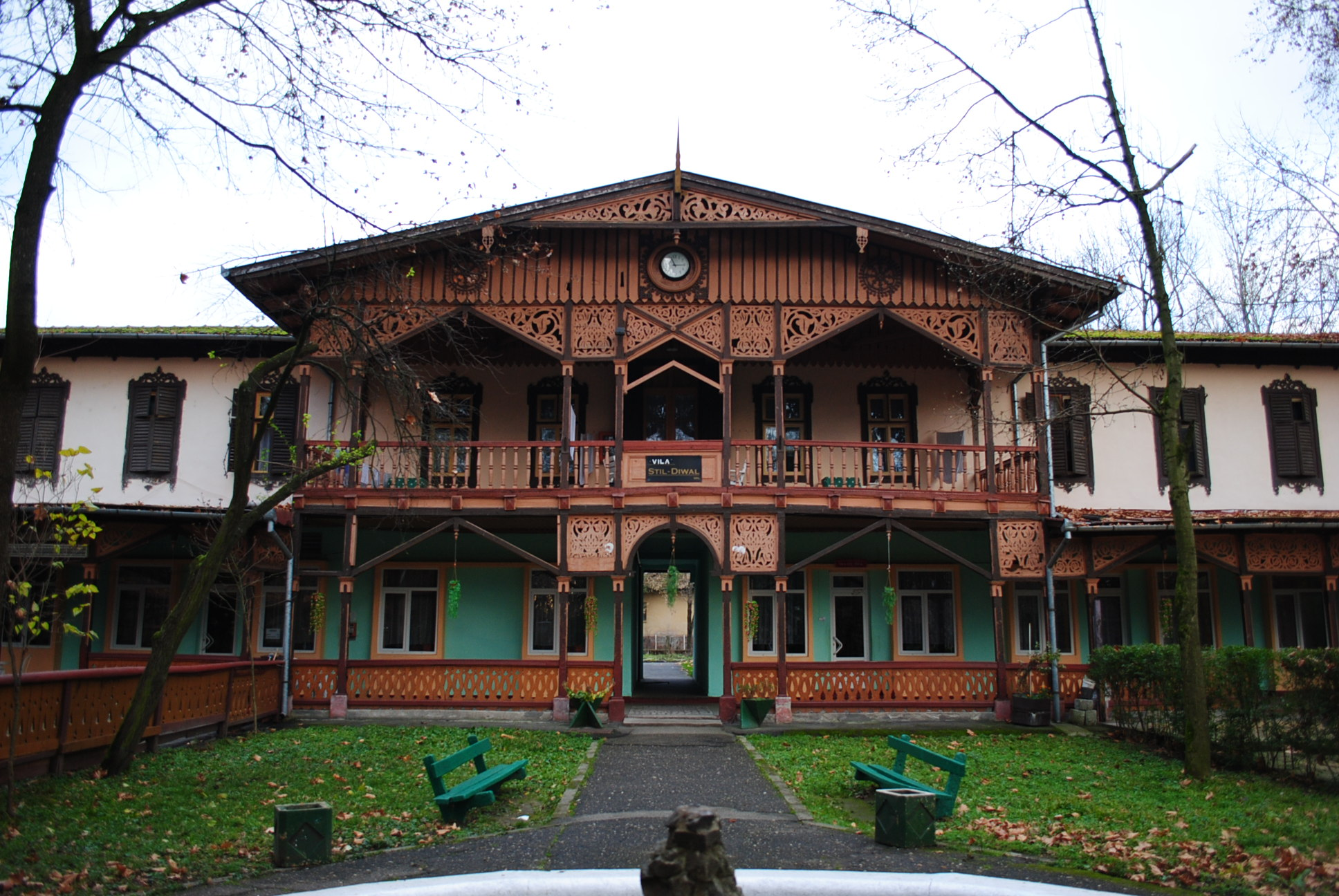
Spa ensemble in Buziaș

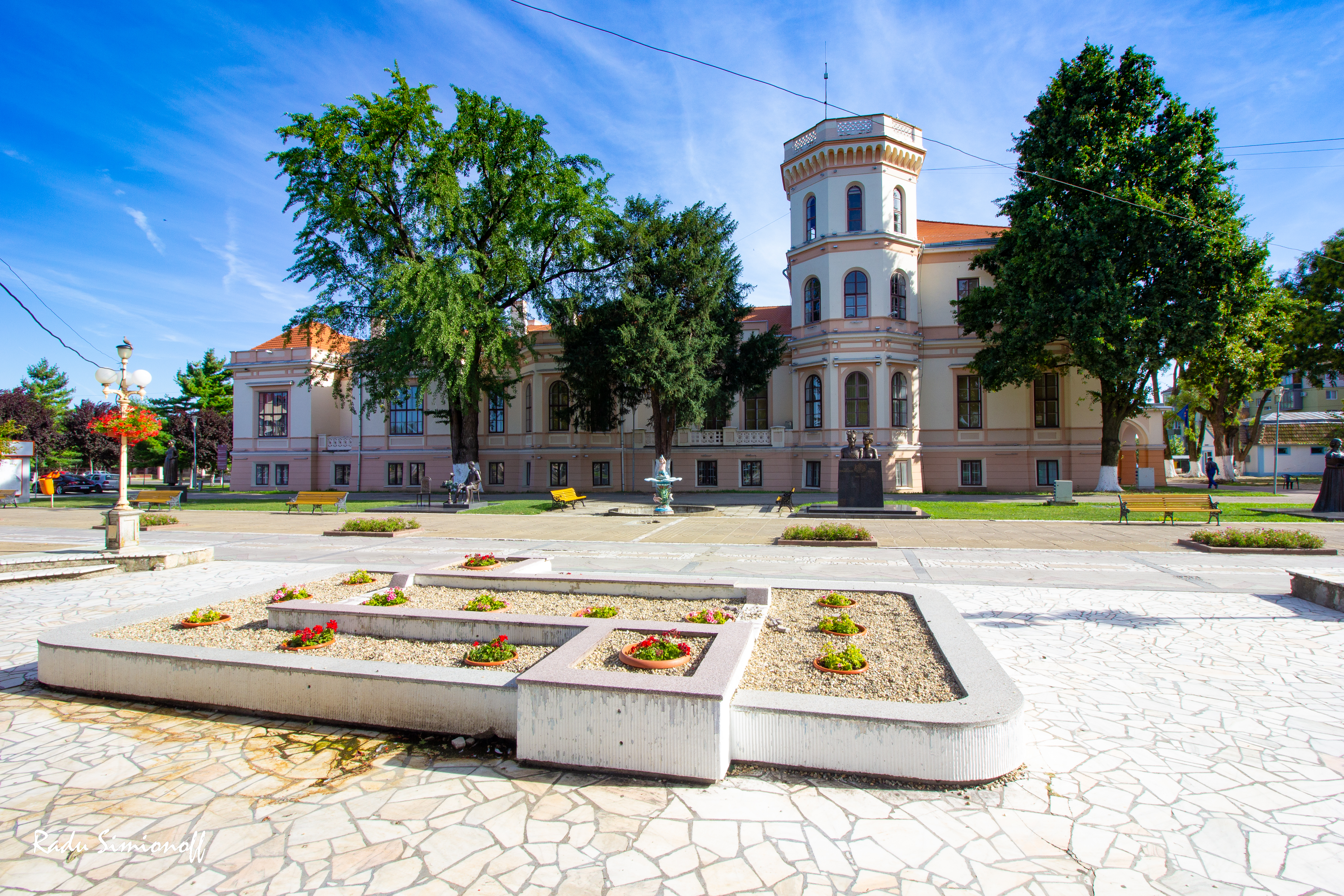
Nákó Castle in Sânnicolau Mare

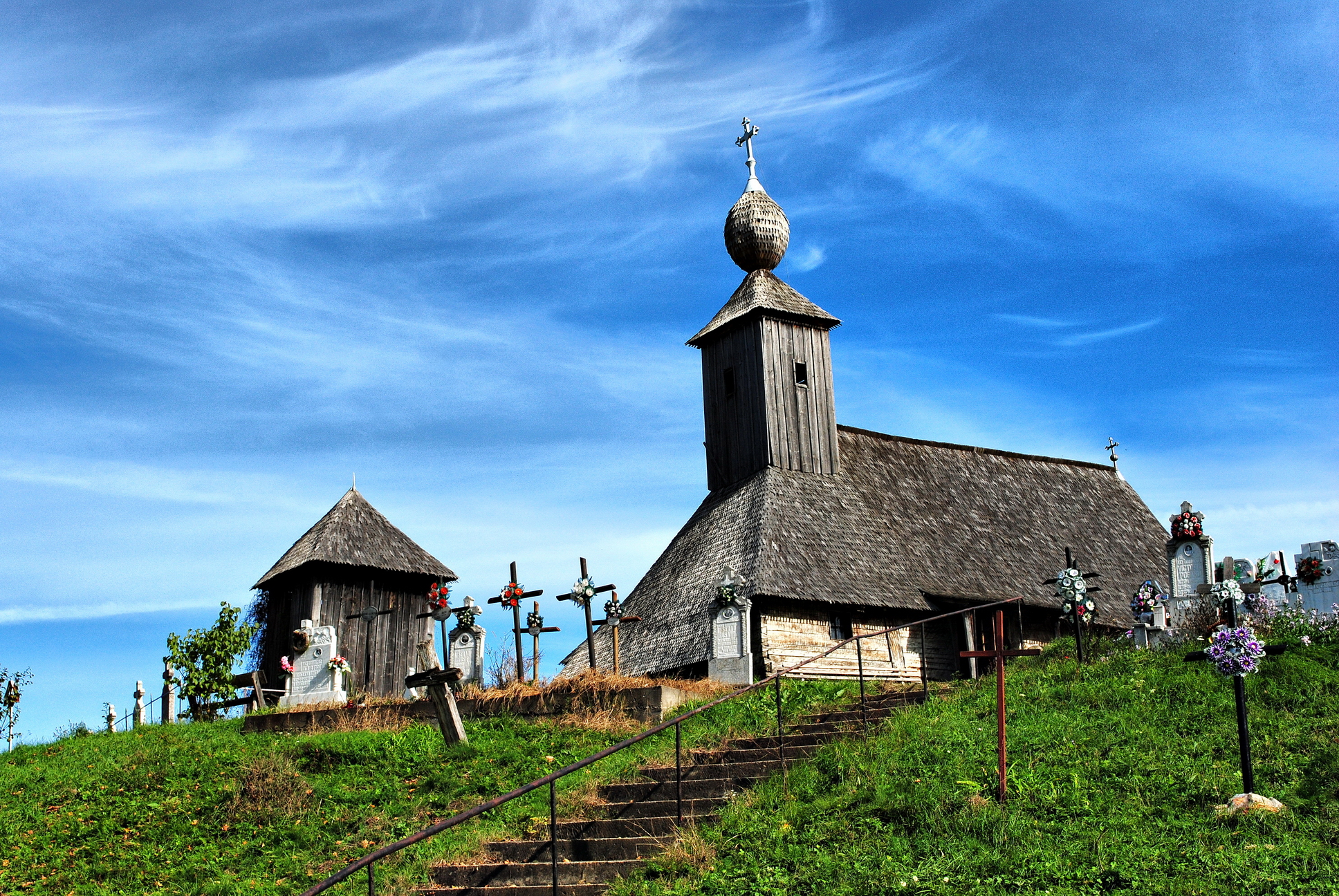
Wooden church in Românești

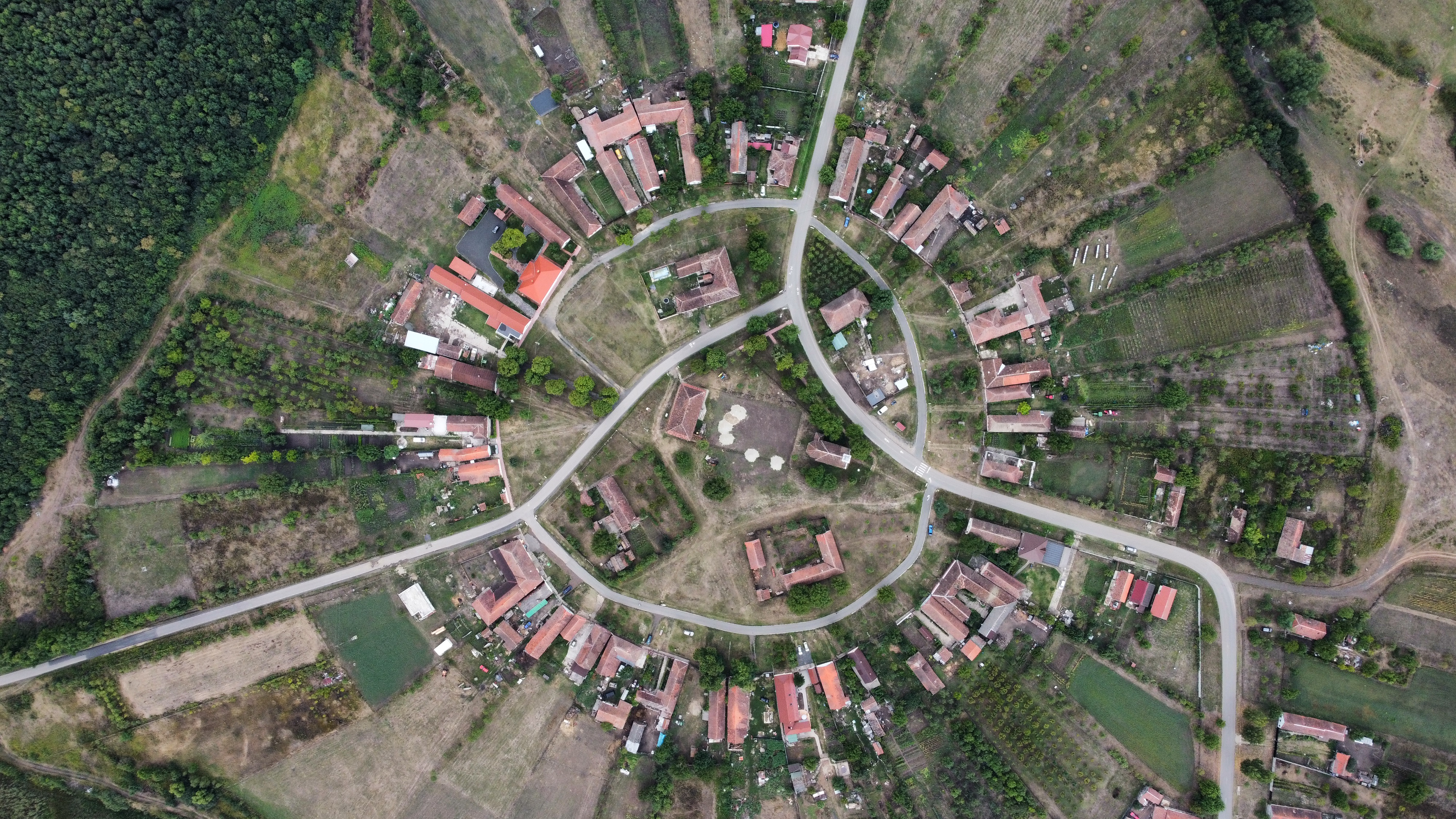
Charlottenburg, the only Rundling in Banat

== Culture ==
=== Music ===
Timiș County has a rich musical history. Notable in this respect are the choirs of Banat Bauer. Banat choirs have their origins in church music, learned in schools, where the teacher was both organist, choir conductor, and not infrequently, composer. The choirs, which were to become a real movement in Banat, were an important means of national manifestation of the people of Banat, through which the Romanian language and culture were promoted. The oldest Romanian choir in Banat was the plowmen's vocal choir, founded in 1857 in Chizătău, which was born from the old church choir. It was also the most famous and appreciated choral formation in the area, which had resounding success at various competitions and festivals, along with other Banat choirs. Banat choirs had a rich repertoire, consisting of national, folk songs or choral works composed by Ion Vidu, Filaret Barbu or Iosif Velceanu.

Timișoara was a reputed city of music in the 19th century. Many famous musicians performed here, including Franz Liszt (1846), Johann Strauss II (1847), David Popper (1867), Leopold Auer (1867), Pablo de Sarasate (1877), Henryk Wieniawski (1877), Johannes Brahms (1879) and Joseph Joachim (1879). The only philharmonic in the county, the Banatul Philharmonic, was founded in 1947 and organizes, in addition to the music season, events in unconventional spaces and successful festivals, such as Timișoara muzicală, the longest-lived cultural festival in Timișoara, which debuted in 1968. The first music school in the county was founded by the Hungarian administration in 1907 in Timișoara. Until 1907, music education was exclusively private.

=== Cuisine ===
Banat cuisine has been strongly influenced by the Austro-Hungarian one, but to a large extent by Greek, Italian and French cuisines too. The dishes prepared in Banat are mostly made of pork, chicken or beef, with vegetables fried in lard or oil, with flour sauces, to make them more consistent, seasoned with pepper, thyme, paprika or caraway. Broadly speaking, Banat cuisine is characterized by fatty and wholesome food; it can be individualized by the unusual association of salty and sweet taste, by the prevalence of soup to the detriment of stew and by showy desserts with multiple influences. Among the traditional dishes in this area are noodle soup, goulash, papricache, sauerkraut, sarme, pljeskavica, rasol, cotoroage and fresh pork preparations and semi-preparations (caltaboș, sângerete, maioș, sausages, slănină, șonc, tobă, etc.). Desserts include krofne, scovergi, bejgli with walnuts or poppy seeds, Cremeschnitte, Apfelküchle, knedles, dobostorta, ischler and vargabéles.

== Education ==
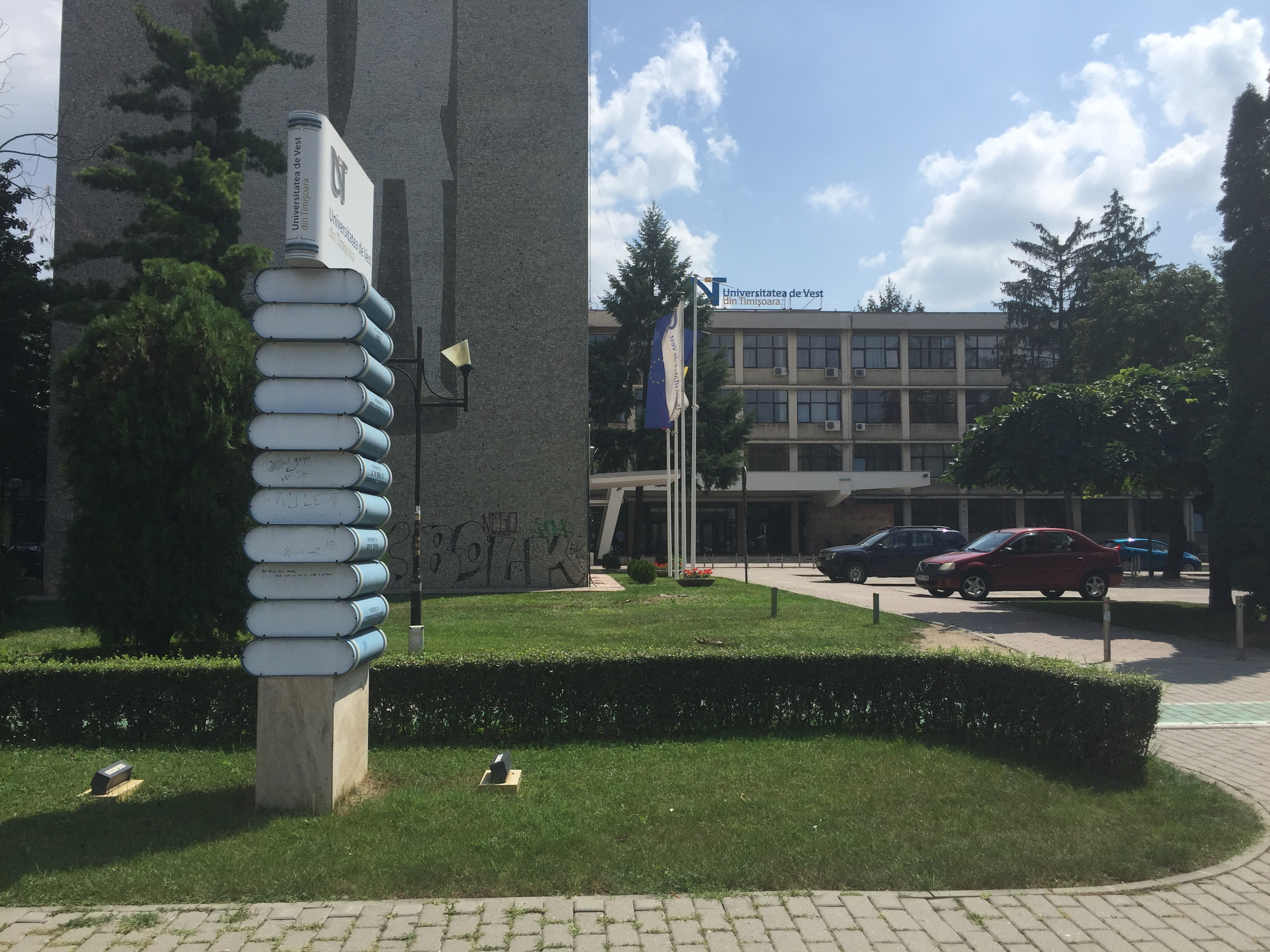
West University of Timișoara, the largest university in Timiș County

In the school year 2019/2020, Timiș County had a school population of 177,301: 25,266 children in pre-school education, 97,934 pupils in pre-university education and 54,101 students in university, post-university, academic and continuing education. In Timiș County, 617 educational units are accredited and authorized, of which 580 are state-funded. Timișoara is one of the four national university centers, together with Bucharest, Cluj-Napoca and Iași, as established by the Ministry of Education, gathering about 8% of the total number of students at national level. Higher education takes place in eight universities in the county, four public and four private:

University	Location	Founded	Faculties	Students (2019/2020)
Public universities
West University	Timișoara	1944	11	15,032
Politehnica University	Timișoara	1920	10	12,613
Victor Babeș University of Medicine and Pharmacy	Timișoara	1944	3	7,326
Banat University of Agricultural Sciences and Veterinary Medicine	Timișoara	1945	6	5,530
Private universities
Ioan Slavici University	Timișoara	2000	2	—N/a
Tibiscus University	Timișoara	1991	4	—N/a
Dimitrie Cantemir Christian University	Timișoara	1991	1	—N/a
Drăgan European University	Lugoj	1992	2	—N/a

== Healthcare ==
At the county level, there are 22 hospitals (15 public and seven private), five medical dispensaries, three mental health centers, 522 medical offices (school, student and family medicine), 846 dental offices, 115 medical laboratories, 87 dental laboratories and a transfusion center. Regarding the pharmaceutical network in Timiș County, in 2019 there were 295 pharmacies (16 public and 279 private), seven pharmaceutical points and 34 pharmaceutical warehouses.

Timișoara is nationally recognized as a center of excellence in medicine. Timișoara has made several breakthroughs in Romanian medicine, including the first in vitro fertilization, the first laser heart surgery and the first stem cell transplant. The Pius Brînzeu County Emergency Clinical Hospital and the Institute of Cardiovascular Diseases from Timișoara were included by the Ministry of Health in the first class of competence (out of five possible). Première Hospital, run by Regina Maria private health network, is the largest private hospital in the west of the country.

== Transport ==
=== Road transport ===
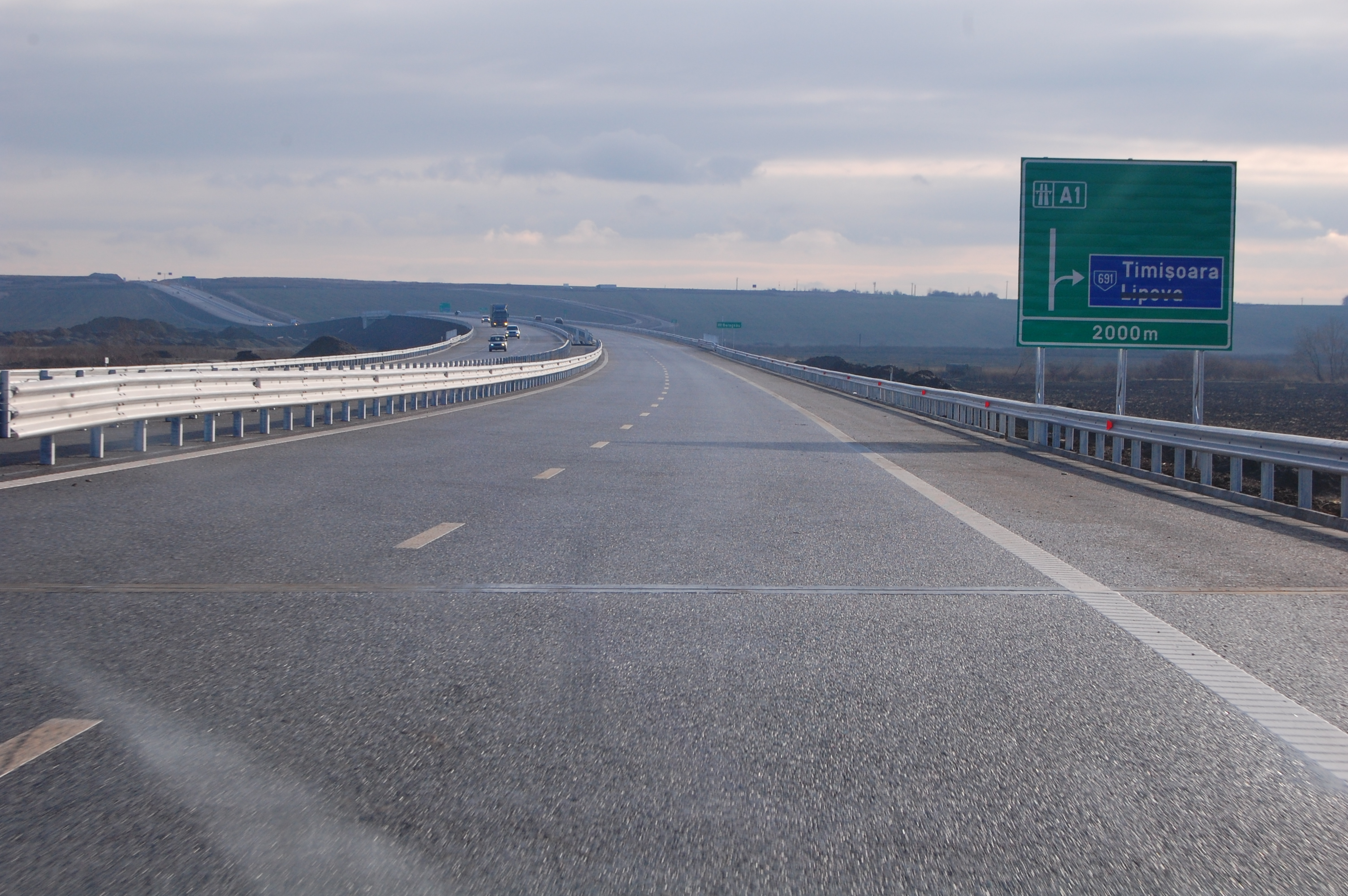
A1 motorway (up) near Timișoara. It is part of the Pan-European Corridor IV (down).

Timiș County is connected to the European transport network by the Central and Global TEN-T networks, so the main corridor that serves it is the Rhine–Danube Corridor, which provides the connection with Vienna, with the central-southern part of Germany (Munich, Stuttgart and Nuremberg and with Strasbourg. The Orient/East–Med Corridor also crosses the county's territory and connects with Budapest.

Inter- and intra-county connections are provided by the main and secondary national roads from which a dense network of local roads emerges. The public road network of Timiș County has a length of about 2,930 km, with a density of 33.7 km/100 km^{2}. More detailed, there are about 563 km of national roads, 1,145 km of county roads and 1,222 km of communal roads. Also, Timiș County is served by almost 108 km of motorways, represented by the A1 and A6 motorways. In 2019, Timiș County had a motorization index of 361.64 vehicles/1,000 inhabitants, being among the highest in the country.

=== Rail transport ===
The railway network totals 795 km, of which 113 are electrified railways. With 91.4 km of railway per 1,000 km^{2}, Timiș County has the densest railway network in the country. On the territory of Timiș County, the railway network consists of a main line (900) and 18 secondary lines belonging to the CFR lines 900 (Bucharest–Timișoara), 200 (Brașov–Curtici) and 300 (Bucharest–Episcopia Bihor). The railway line 900, whose route is Bucharest (north)–Roșiori (north)–Craiova–Filiași–Caransebeș–Timișoara (north), crosses the county on the Lugoj–Timișoara relation. It is part of the Pan-European Corridor IV.

In Timiș County there are 133 stations operated by state and private railway operators such as Căile Ferate Române (CFR), Astra Trans Carpatic and Regio Călători. The busiest of them is Timișoara North, with over 1.7 million passengers in 2011.

=== Air transport ===
Timiș County is served by Traian Vuia International Airport, located northeast of Timișoara, about 10 km from the city center. With 1.5 million passengers in 2019, it is the third busiest Romanian airport, after Bucharest's Henri Coandă International Airport and Cluj-Napoca's Avram Iancu International Airport. Traian Vuia Airport concentrates 17.2% of the total number of passengers boarded at Romanian airports, 35.5% of the total tons of goods loaded and 13.7% of the total number of flights.

Cioca Airfield, used as an airport for a short period of time, between 1941 and 1942, serves today as airfield for recreational aircraft, air taxis and utility aircraft and venue for various festivals. It is located in the northwest of Timișoara, about 5 km from it.

=== Naval transport ===
Timiș County is crossed by one of the few artificially arranged waterways in Romania, the Bega Canal. The Bega Canal is part of the Rhine–Main–Danube system, making possible the connection between the North Sea and the Black Sea. The length of the canal on the Romanian territory is about 44.5 km and 74 km on the Serbian territory. The navigable part of the canal starts from Timișoara from where it continues to the southwest until it flows into the Tisza, located on Serbian territory. The Bega Canal is the first navigable canal built in Romania. Originally built for the sanitation of floodplains around Timișoara, it was later arranged for navigation.

Timișoara is the only Romanian city with public transport by water, made with vaporetto-like boats along the nine stations on the Bega Canal.

== Notable people ==
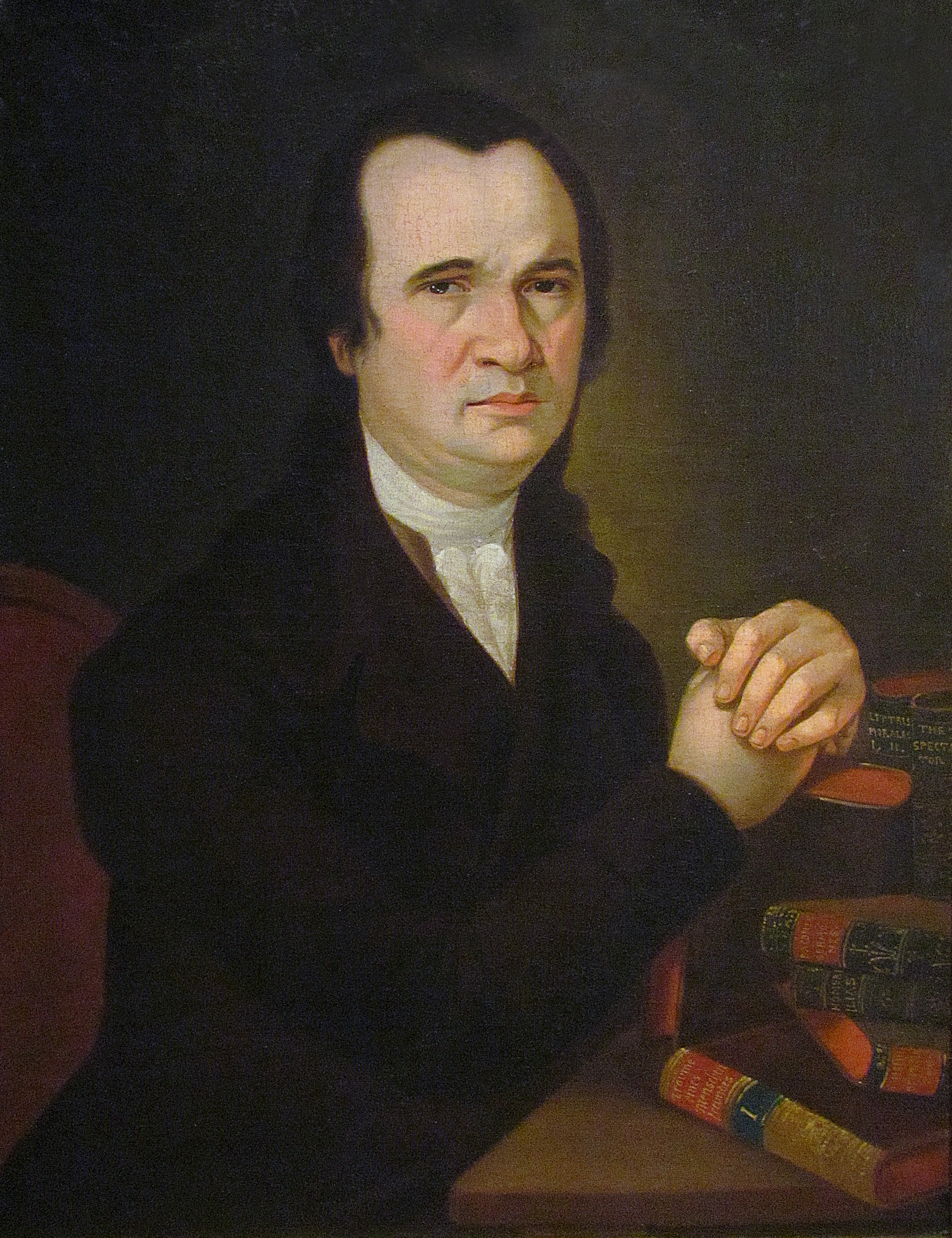
Dositej Obradović

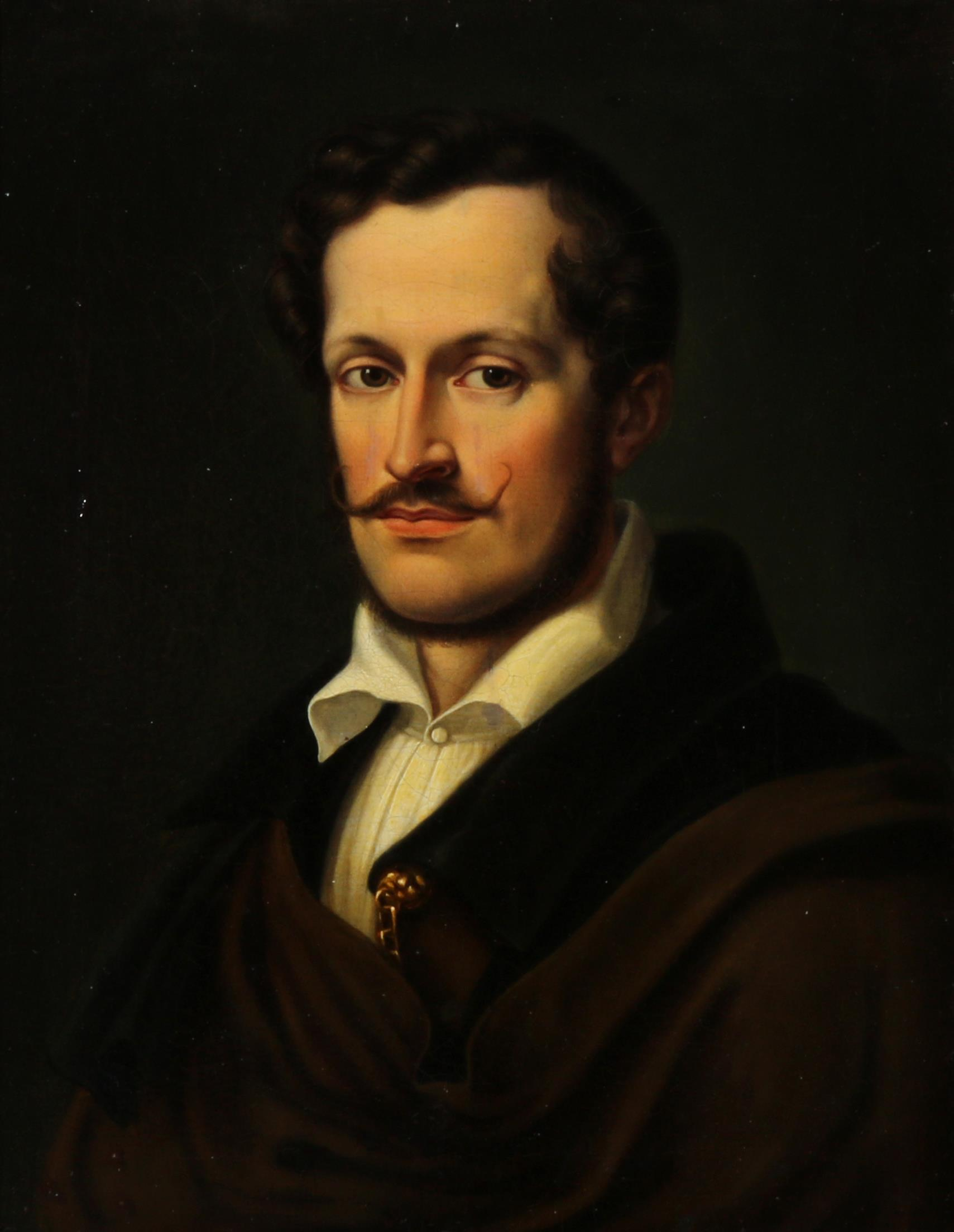
Nikolaus Lenau

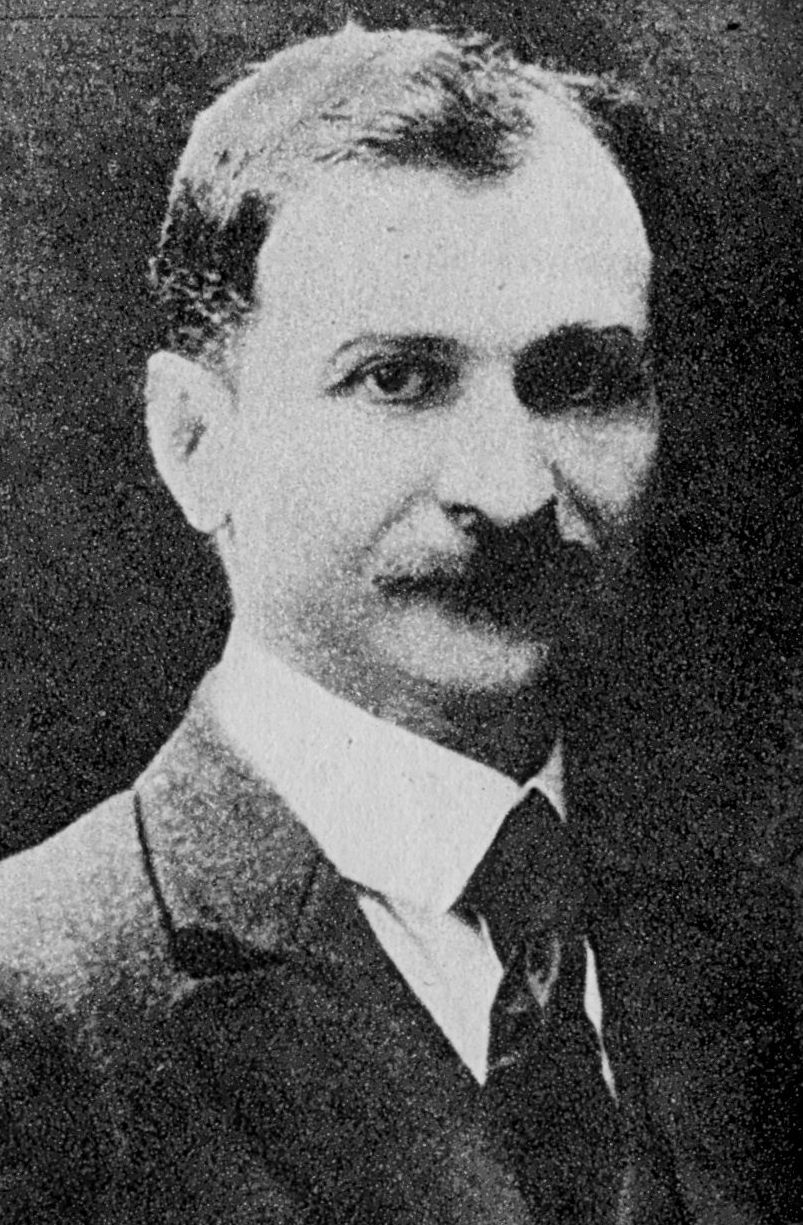
Traian Vuia

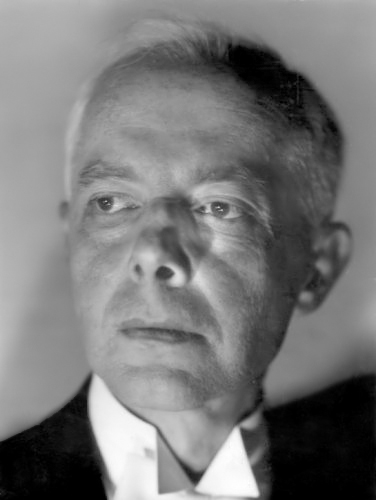
Béla Bartók

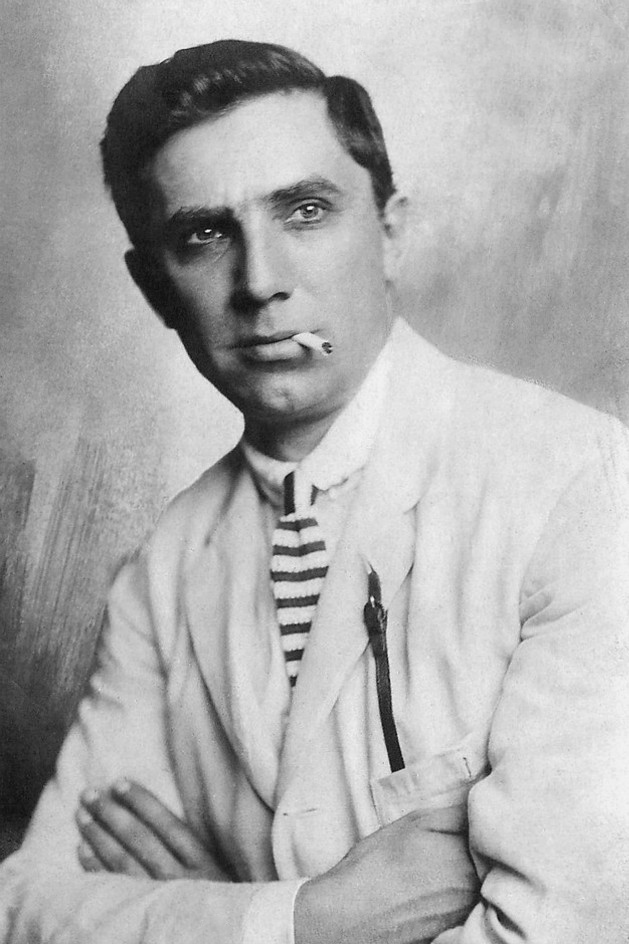
Bela Lugosi

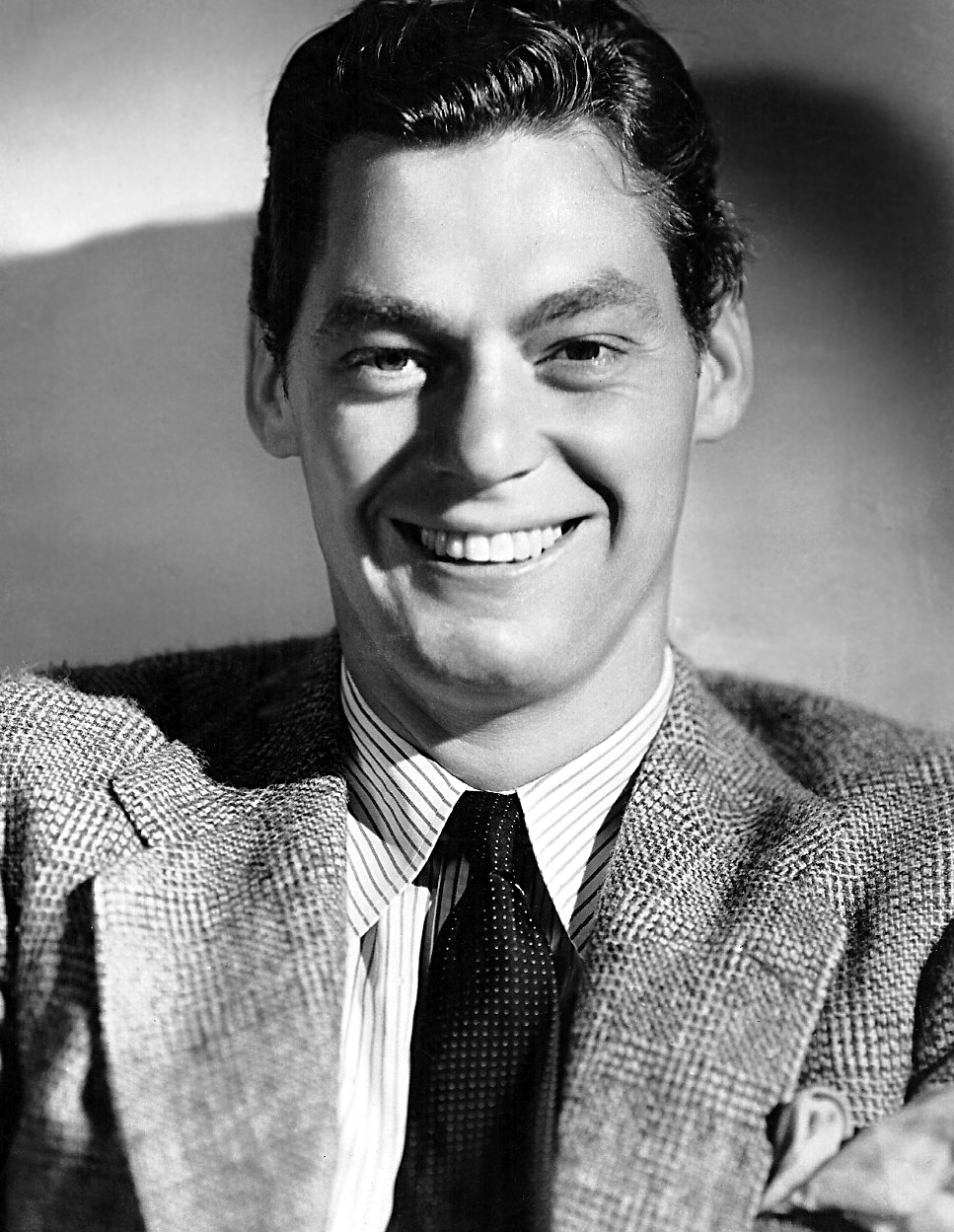
Johnny Weissmuller

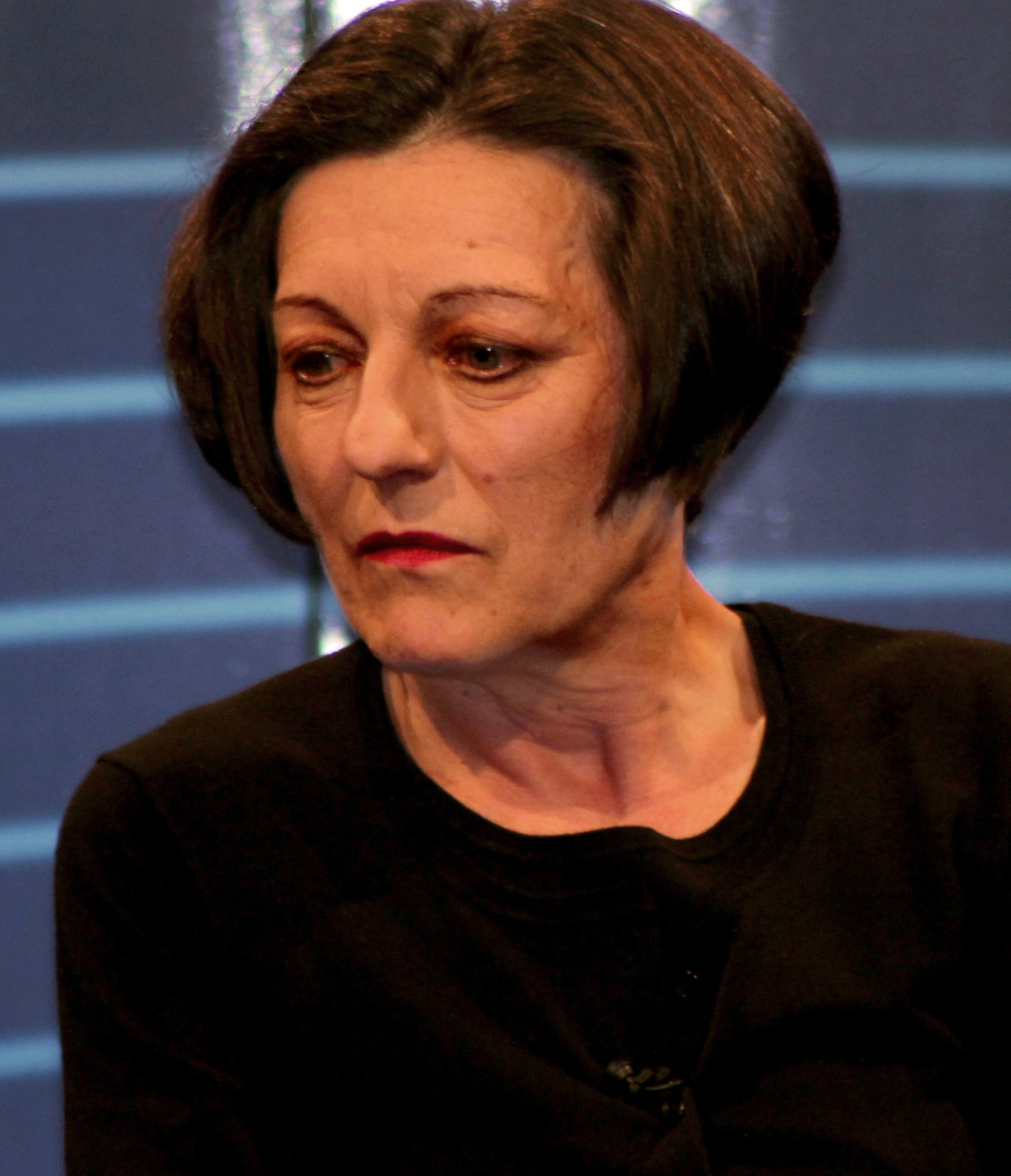
Herta Müller
- Osman Aga of Temesvar (1670-1725), Ottoman army officer, historian, and famous travel writer
- Dositej Obradović (1739–1811), educator, writer and reformer
- Nikolaus Lenau (1802–1850), poet
- Ion Ivanovici (1845–1902), military band conductor and composer
- Hermann Kövess von Kövessháza (1854–1924), Commander-in-Chief of the Austro-Hungarian Army
- Traian Vuia (1872–1950), inventor and aviation pioneer
- Béla Bartók (1881–1945), composer, pianist and ethnomusicologist
- Bela Lugosi (1882–1956), actor
- Károly Kerényi (1897–1973), scholar and philologist
- Johnny Weissmuller (1904–1984), Olympic swimmer, water polo player and actor
- Ștefan Kovács (1920–1995), football player and coach
- György Kurtág (b. 1926), composer and pianist
- Josef Posipal (1927–1997), footballer
- Iolanda Balaș (1936–2016), Olympic athlete
- Ana Blandiana (b. 1942), writer and civic activist
- Daniel Ciobotea (b. 1951), Patriarch of the Romanian Orthodox Church (2007–present)
- Herta Müller (b. 1953), writer and recipient of the 2009 Nobel Prize in Literature
- Cosmin Contra (b. 1975), football player and manager
- Edina Gallovits-Hall (b. 1984), tennis player
- Gabriel Torje (b. 1989), footballer

== See also ==
- Krassó-Szörény, Temes and Torontál counties of the Kingdom of Hungary
- Severin and Timiș-Torontal counties of the Kingdom of Romania
