= Atlantic Corridor (disambiguation) =

Atlantic Corridor may refer to:

- Atlantic Axis high-speed rail line, Spanish high-speed railway line
- Atlantic Core Network Corridor, Trans-European network of infrastructures connecting Portugal, Spain, France and Germany
- Atlantic Corridor, Irish road project
