= North Sea–Baltic Corridor =

Trans-European Transport Network axe

Route information
- Length: 6,655 km (4,135 mi)

Major junctions
- Start end: (Sweden) Luleå
- End end: (Belgium) Antwerp

Location
- Countries: Sweden; Finland; Estonia; Latvia; Lithuania; Poland; Germany; Netherlands; Belgium

Highway system
- International E-road network; A Class; B Class

The North Sea–Baltic Corridor is the number 2 of the ten priority axes of the Trans-European Transport Network (TEN-T).

== Description ==
The North Sea–Baltic Corridor develops its network from the North Sea to the Baltic connecting among others the following European cities.

Country	City
Sweden	Luleå
Finland	Oulu
Finland	Helsinki
Estonia	Tallinn
Latvia	Riga
Latvia	Ventspils
Lithuania	Kaunas
Lithuania	Klaipėda
Lithuania	Vilnius
Poland	Warsaw
Poland	Poznań
Germany	Frankfurt (Oder)
Germany	Berlin
Germany	Hamburg
Germany	Magdeburg
Germany	Braunschweig
Germany	Hanover
Germany	Bremen
Germany	Osnabrück
Netherlands	Utrecht
Netherlands	Rotterdam
Belgium	Brussels
Belgium	Antwerp

== History ==
The original corridor of the Core Network to be called Warsaw–Midlands (route Warsaw – Poznań – Frankfurt (Oder) – Berlin – Hannover – Osnabrück – Enschede – Utrecht – Amsterdam/Rotterdam – Felixstowe – Birmingham/Manchester – Liverpool), but following the exit of the United Kingdom from the European Union following Brexit, the axis would no longer reach the British Islands, therefore it was enlarged and redesigned according to the current route from Helsinki to the Benelux.

== See also ==
- Rail Baltica
