= Scandinavian–Mediterranean Corridor =

European transportation corridor

Route information
- Length: 4,858 km (3,019 mi)

Major junctions
- North end: (Finland) Helsinki
- South end: (Malta) Valletta

Location
- Countries: Finland; Sweden; Denmark; Germany; Austria; Italy; Malta

Highway system
- International E-road network; A Class; B Class

The Scandinavian–Mediterranean Corridor, shortened as Scan–Med Corridor and known also as Helsinki–Valletta Corridor, is the 5th of 10 priority axes of the Trans-European Transport Network.

== Description ==
The Scan–Med Corridor is the longest of the nine TEN-T Core Network Corridors, it develops its network from the Seine to the Danube on the following three axes and through the following European cities (see route in magenta on the official TEN-T map published on the European Union website visible below in the note).

- Helsinki – Turku – Stockholm – Malmö – København – Fehmarn – Hamburg – Hannover
- Bremen – Hannover – Kassel – Würzburg – Nürnberg – München – Innsbruck – Brenner – Bozen (Bolzano) – Trento – Verona – Bologna – Rome – Naples – Bari
- Naples – Strait of Messina Bridge (Note: As of March 2023, the building works for the Strait of Messina Bridge should start in June 2024.) – Palermo – Valletta

== History ==
In 2018, it was decided to extend the Corridor to reach Narvik and Haparanda-Tornio from Stockholm and Helsinki.

On 18 May 2021 the European Commission in an answer to a written question from a parliamentarian, confirmed that the Messina Bridge (the connection between Sicily and the Italian mainland) is of fundamental importance to the objective of the Green Deal since it guarantees connectivity and accessibility of all European regions is at the heart of the TEN-T policy. However, it is up to the Italian State to contract out the work, for which some EU programs could contribute under the 2021-2027 multiannual financial framework.

== See also ==
- Berlin–Palermo railway axis
- Strait of Messina Bridge
