= North Sea–Mediterranean Corridor =

Inland waterways in Benelux and France linking North Sea to Mediterranean

Route information
- Length: 933 km (580 mi)

Major junctions
- Start end: (United Kingdom) Glasgow
- End end: (France) Marseille and Fos-sur-Mer

Location
- Countries: Ireland; United Kingdom; France; Belgium

Highway system
- International E-road network; A Class; B Class

The North Sea–Mediterranean Corridor is the eighth of 10 priority axes of the Trans-European Transport Network. It stretches from Ireland and the north of UK through the Netherlands, Belgium and Luxembourg to the Mediterranean Sea in the south of France.

== History ==
According to the European Union:

This multimodal corridor, comprising inland waterways in Benelux and France, aims not only at offering better multimodal services between the North Sea ports, the Maas (French: Meuse), Rhine, Scheldt, Seine, Saone and Rhone river basins and the ports of Fos-sur-Mer and Marseille, but also at better interconnecting the British Isles with continental Europe.
