= Rhine–Danube Corridor =

Central Europe road and rail investment priority area

Route information
- Length: 2,137 km (1,328 mi)

Major junctions
- Start end: (France) Strasbourg
- End end: (Romania) Sulina

Location
- Countries: France; Germany; Austria; Hungary; Romania

Highway system
- International E-road network; A Class; B Class

The Rhine–Danube Corridor (previously known as Seine–Danube Corridor and Strassburg–Danube Corridor) is the ninth of the ten priority axes of the Trans-European Transport Network.

== Description ==
The Strasbourg–Danube Corridor develops its network from the Seine to the Danube on the following three axes and through the following European cities (see route in cyan on the official TEN-T map published on the European Union website visible below in the note).

- Strasbourg – Stuttgart – München – Wels/Linz
- Strasbourg – Mannheim – Frankfurt – Würzburg – Nürnberg – Regensburg – Passau – Wels/Linz
- Wels/Linz – Wien – Budapest – Arad – Brașov – Bucharest – Constanța - Sulina
