= Orient/East–Med Corridor =

Oreient/East–Med Corridor

Route information
- Length: 3,712 km (2,307 mi)

Major junctions
- From: (Germany) Hamburg
- To: (Cyprus) Nicosia

Location
- Countries: Germany; Czech Republic; Austria; Slovakia; Hungary; Romania; Bulgaria; Greece; Cyprus

Highway system
- International E-road network; A Class; B Class

The Orient/East–Med Corridor is the number 4 of the ten priority axes of the Trans-European Transport Network (TEN-T).

== Description ==
This corridor will connect Central Europe with the maritime interfaces of the North, Baltic, Black and Mediterranean Seas.

- Hamburg–Berlin
- Rostock–Berlin–Dresden
- Bremerhaven/Wilhelmshaven–Magdeburg–Dresden
- Dresden–Ústí nad Labem–Mělník/Prague–Kolín
- Kolín–Pardubice–Brno–Vienna/Bratislava–Budapest–Arad–Timișoara–Craiova–Calafat–Vidin–Sofia
- Sofia–Plovdiv–Burgas
- Plovdiv–Turkey border
- Sofia–Thessaloniki–Athens–Limassol–Nicosia
- Athens–Patras/Igoumenitsa
