= Atlantic Core Network Corridor =

Trans-european transport initiative

Atlantic Corridor

Route information
- Length: 8,200 km (5,100 mi)

Major junctions
- From: (Portugal) Lisbon
- To: (Germany) Mannheim

Location
- Countries: Portugal; Spain; France; Germany

Highway system
- International E-road network; A Class; B Class

The Atlantic Core Network Corridor or simply Atlantic Corridor is a European initiative developed from the Trans-European Transport Network to create a high capacity railway and road corridor connecting Portugal, Spain and France, and later extended to Germany as well. When finished, the Iberian branch is planned to become one of the main transport networks of the Peninsula, alongside the Mediterranean Corridor, and, in general, it has been said to be "fundamental for European cohesion". It will include the following sections:

- Algeciras – Bobadilla – Madrid
- Sines/Lisbon – Madrid – Valladolid
- Lisbon – Aveiro – Leixões/Porto
- Aveiro – Valladolid – Vitoria – Bergara – Bilbao/Bordeaux – Paris – Le Havre/Metz – Mannheim/Strasbourg

== History ==
Progress varies from region to region. In Portugal, for example, the planned railway infrastructures were included in the Ferrovia 2020 initiative, presented in 2016. However, by the end of 2022, only 15% of the construction had been finished. In Basque Country, the so called Basque Y (named after the region it crosses and the shape it has) is expected to be completed and operational by 2030, but the connection from the French side has been postponed and is not planned to be finished until after 2037.
