= Trans-European Transport Network =

European Union infrastructure corridors and agreements

Map of the European Transport Corridors

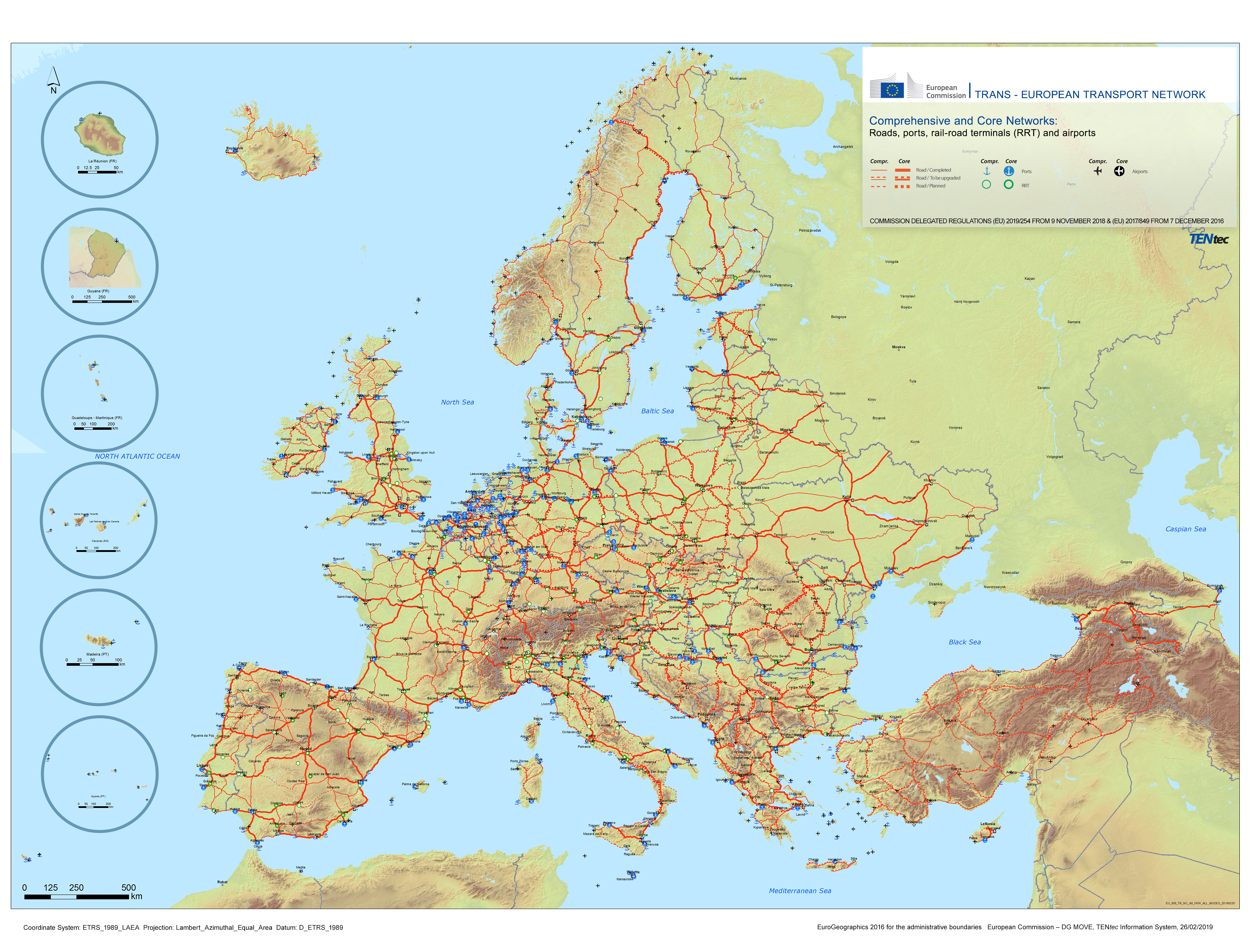
Map of the TEN-T Comprehensive and Core Networks

The Trans-European Transport Network (TEN-T) is a planned network of roads, railways, airports and water infrastructure in the European Union. The TEN-T network is part of a wider system of Trans-European Networks (TENs), including a telecommunications network (eTEN) and a proposed energy network (TEN-E or Ten-Energy). The European Commission adopted the first action plans on trans-European networks in 1990.

TEN-T envisages coordinated improvements to primary roads, railways, inland waterways, airports, seaports, inland ports and traffic management systems, providing integrated and intermodal long-distance, high-speed routes. A decision to adopt TEN-T was made by the European Parliament and Council in July 1996. The EU works to promote the networks by a combination of leadership, coordination, issuance of guidelines and funding aspects of development.

These projects are technically and financially managed by the Innovation and Networks Executive Agency (INEA), which superseded the Trans-European Transport Network Executive Agency (TEN-T EA) on 31 December 2013. The tenth and newest project, the Rhine-Danube Corridor, was announced for the 2014–2020 financial period.

== History ==
TEN-T guidelines were initially adopted on 23 July 1996, with Decision No 1692/96/EC of the European Parliament and of the Council on Community guidelines for the development of the trans-European transport network. In May 2001, the European Parliament and the Council adopted a Decision No 1346/2001/EC, which amended the TEN-T Guidelines with respect to seaports, inland ports and intermodal terminals.

In April 2004, the European Parliament and the Council adopted Decision No 884/2004/EC (added to the list by Decision No 884/2004/EC), amending Decision No 1692/96/EC on Community guidelines for the development of the trans-European transport network. The April 2004 revision was a more fundamental change to TEN-T policies, intended to accommodate EU enlargement and consequent changes in traffic flows.

The evolution of the TEN-T was facilitated by a proposal in 1994 which included a series of priority projects.

In December 2013, with the Regulations (EU) 1315/2013 (TEN-T Guidelines), and (EU) 1316/2013 (Connecting Europe Facility 1), the TEN-T network has been defined on three levels, the Comprehensive network and the Core network, and therein the 9 Core network corridors.

On 17 October 2013, nine Core network corridors (instead of the 30 TENT Priority projects) were announced. These were:

1. the Baltic–Adriatic Corridor (Poland–Czech Republic/Slovakia–Austria–Italy);
2. the North Sea–Baltic Corridor (Finland–Estonia–Latvia–Lithuania–Poland–Germany–Netherlands/Belgium);
3. the Mediterranean Corridor (Spain–France–Northern Italy–Slovenia–Croatia–Hungary);
4. the Orient/East–Med Corridor (Germany–Czech Republic–Austria/Slovakia–Hungary–Romania–Bulgaria–Greece–Cyprus);
5. the Scandinavian–Mediterranean Corridor (Finland–Sweden–Denmark–Germany–Austria–Italy);
6. the Rhine–Alpine Corridor (Netherlands/Belgium–Germany–Switzerland–Italy);
7. the Atlantic Corridor (formerly known as Lisboa–Strasbourg Corridor) (Portugal–Spain–France);
8. the North Sea–Mediterranean Corridor (Ireland–UK–Netherlands–Belgium–Luxembourg–Marseille(France),
9. the Rhine–Danube Corridor (Germany–Austria–Slovakia–Hungary–Romania with branch Germany–Czech Republic–Slovakia);

In July 2021, with the Regulation (EU) 2021/1153 (Connecting Europe Facility 2), the 9 Core network corridors were extended, partially significantly (e.g. Atlantic, North-Sea Baltic, Scand-Med) while the North Sea-Med because of Brexit has changed to Ireland–Belgium-Netherlands and Ireland–France.

In December 2021, the European Commission's proposal for a new Regulation on TEN-T guidelines (COM 2021/821) proposes inter alia for the future a dissolution of selected Core network corridors (Orient/East–Med, North Sea–Mediterranean), its integration in other corridors (Rhine–Danube, North Sea–Alpine) and the creation of new aligned corridors (Baltic–Black–Aegean Seas, Western Balkans).

Connections to neighbours

The development of Ten-T in the Balkans (Albania, Bosnia and Herzegovina, Kosovo, Montenegro, North Macedonia, and Serbia) was given in 2017 to the Southeast Europe Transport Community.

In 2017, it was decided that the Trans-European Transport Networks would be extended further into Eastern Europe and would include Eastern Partnership member states. The furthest eastern expansion of the Trans-European Transport Network reached Armenia in February 2019.

As per the 2021 proposal, connections shall also lead to the UK, Switzerland, the South Mediterranean, Turkey, and the Western Balkans.

In July 2022, it was agreed to link four European Transport Corridors with Moldova and Ukraine and to drop Russia and Belarus from the TEN-T map. An August 2023 report recommended TEN-T be extended to Moldova and Ukraine with a standard gauge (1435mm) rail line, to assist in their integration with EU rail networks, some lines running alongside the 1520mm lines to avoid disruption during construction.

== Core Network Corridors ==
This is the complete list of the TEN-T Core Network Corridors.

Corridor	Name	From	Via	To	Length
1	Baltic–Adriatic Corridor	(Poland) Gdynia	(Austria) Vienna	(Italy) Ravenna	2,400 km (1,500 mi)
2	North Sea–Baltic Corridor	(Finland) Helsinki	(Poland) Warsaw	(Belgium) Antwerp	3,200 km (2,000 mi)
3	Mediterranean Corridor	(Spain) Algeciras	(France) Lyon – (Italy) Venice	(Hungary) Miskolc	3,000 km (1,900 mi)
4	Orient/East–Med Corridor	(Germany) Hamburg	(Hungary) Budapest – (Bulgaria) Sofia	(Cyprus) Nicosia	3,700 km (2,300 mi)
5	Scandinavian–Mediterranean Corridor	(Finland) Helsinki	(Denmark) Copenhagen – (Germany) Munich	(Malta) Valletta	4,858 km (3,019 mi)
6	Rhine–Alpine Corridor	(Italy) Genoa	(Germany) Cologne	(Netherlands) Rotterdam	1,300 km (810 mi)
7	Atlantic Corridor	(Portugal) Lisbon	(Spain) Vitoria-Gasteiz	(France) Strasbourg	8,200 km (5,100 mi)
8	North Sea–Mediterranean Corridor	(Republic of Ireland) Dublin	(Republic of Ireland) Cork – (France) Le Havre	(Belgium) Brussels	933 km (580 mi)
9	Rhine–Danube Corridor	(France) Strasbourg	(Hungary) Budapest - (Romania) Bucharest	(Romania) Constanța	2,137 km (1,328 mi)

== Funding timeline ==
Financial support for the implementation of TEN-T guidelines stems from the following rules:

- Regulation (EC) No 2236/95 of 18 September 1995 contains general rules for the granting of Community financial aid in the field of trans-European networks.
- Regulation (EC) No 1655/1999 of the European Parliament and of the Council of 19 July 1999 amends Regulation (EC) No 2236/95.
- Regulation (EC) No 807/2004 of the European Parliament and of the Council of 21 April 2004 amends Council Regulation (EC) No 2236/95.
- Regulation (EC) No 680/2007 of the European Parliament and of the Council of 20 June 2007 supplies general rules for granting Community financial aid for trans-European transport and energy networks.

In general, TEN-T projects are mostly funded by national or state governments. Other funding sources include: European Community funds (ERDF, Cohesion Funds, TEN-T budget), loans from international financial institutions (e.g. the European Investment Bank), and private funding.

== List of transport networks ==
Each transportation mode has a network. The networks are:

- Trans-European road network
- Trans-European Rail network, which includes the Trans-European high-speed rail network as well as the Trans-European conventional rail network
- Trans-European Inland Waterway network and inland ports
- Trans-European Seaport network
- Motorways of the Sea (added by Decision No 884/2004/EC)
- Trans-European Airport network
- Trans-European Combined Transport network
- Trans-European Shipping Management and Information network
- Trans-European Air Traffic Management network, which includes the Single European Sky and SESAR concepts
- Trans-European Positioning and Navigation network, which includes the Galileo

== Previous priorities ==
At its meeting in Essen in 1994, the European Council endorsed a list of 14 TEN-T ‘specific’ projects, drawn up by a group chaired by then Commission Vice-President Henning Christophersen. Following the 2003 recommendations from the Van Miert TEN-T high-level group, the Commission compiled a list of 30 priority projects to be launched before 2010.

The 30 axes and priority projects were:

1. Railway axis Berlin–Verona/Milan–Bologna–Naples–Messina–Palermo
2. High-speed railway axis Paris–Brussels–Cologne–Amsterdam–London
3. High-speed railway axis of south-west Europe
4. High-speed railway axis east
5. Betuwe line
6. Railway axis Lyon-Trieste-Divača/Koper-Divača-Ljubljana-Budapest-Ukrainian border
7. Motorway axis Igoumenitsa/Patras–Athens–Sofia–Budapest
8. Multimodal axis Portugal/Spain–rest of Europe
9. Railway axis Cork–Dublin–Belfast–Stranraer
10. Malpensa Airport
11. Øresund Bridge
12. Nordic triangle railway/road axis
13. United Kingdom/Ireland/Benelux road axis
14. West Coast Main Line
15. Galileo
16. Freight railway axis Sines/Algeciras-Madrid-Paris
17. Railway axis Paris–Strasbourg–Stuttgart–Vienna–Bratislava
18. Rhine/Meuse–Main–Danube inland waterway axis
19. High-speed rail interoperability on the Iberian peninsula
20. Fehmarn belt railway axis
21. Motorways of the Sea
22. Railway axis Athens–Sofia–Budapest–Vienna–Prague– Nuremberg/Dresden
23. Railway axis Gdańsk–Warsaw–Brno/Bratislava–Vienna
24. Railway axis Lyon/Genoa–Basel–Duisburg–Rotterdam/Antwerp
25. Motorway axis Gdańsk–Brno/Bratislava–Vienna
26. Railway/road axis Ireland/United Kingdom/continental Europe
27. Rail Baltic axis Warsaw–Kaunas–Riga–Tallinn–Helsinki
28. EuroCap-Rail on the Brussels–Luxembourg–Strasbourg railway axis
29. Railway axis of the Ionian/Adriatic intermodal corridor
30. Inland waterway Seine–Scheldt

As of 2019, several of them are finished, e.g. no 2, 5 and 11, other are ongoing e.g. no 12 and 17, and some are not started, e.g no 27.

== Related networks ==
In addition to the various TENs, there are ten Pan-European corridors, which are paths between major urban centres and ports, mainly in Eastern Europe, that have been identified as requiring major investment.

The international E-road network is a naming system for major roads in Europe managed by the United Nations Economic Commission for Europe. It numbers roads with a designation beginning with "E" (such as "E1").

== See also ==
- Berlin–Palermo railway axis
- India–Middle East–Europe Economic Corridor
- Transport in Europe
- TRACECA
