= PRM TSI =

The Technical Specifications of Interoperability relating to "persons with reduced mobility" (PRM TSI) is a set of supranational technical standards designed to ensure accessibility for individuals with disabilities and reduced mobility within the rail systems of Europe (including United Kingdom). A part of the Technical Specifications for Interoperability (TSI) framework, it was established by the European Union initially as a decision in 2007, and subsequently as a regulation, in 2014.

The PRM TSI aims to enhance accessibility by addressing various aspects of rail infrastructure and rolling stock, including platform heights, platform gaps, accessibility of passenger train toilets and other facilities, and provision of assistance and information for passengers. In the United Kingdom, it superseded the Rail Vehicle Accessibility Regulations (RVAR) for main line passenger rail but not for light rail such as trams.

To ensure effective implementation, the European Railway Agency (ERA) has published a guide outlining the PRM TSI requirements and recommendations for compliance. After Brexit, United Kingdom's Rail Safety and Standards Board (RSSB) established the National Technical Specification Notice Mirror Group (PRM TSI/NTSN MG) to continuously review the standards and advise the Department for Transport on their implementation. The PRM TSI is subject to periodic updates, with the most recent revision in 2023. As the standards are being heightened, railways operators are obligated to periodically make significant expenditures to ensure compliance.
