= Rail transport by country =

This page provides an index of articles on rail transport by country.

== International railway organisations ==
- International Union of Railways (UIC)
- International Union of Public Transport (UITP)
- Association of American Railways (AAR)
- Organization for Cooperation of Railways (OSJD)
- African Union of Railways (AUR)
- European Union Agency for Railways (ERA)
- European Rail Infrastructure Managers (EIM)

== Africa ==
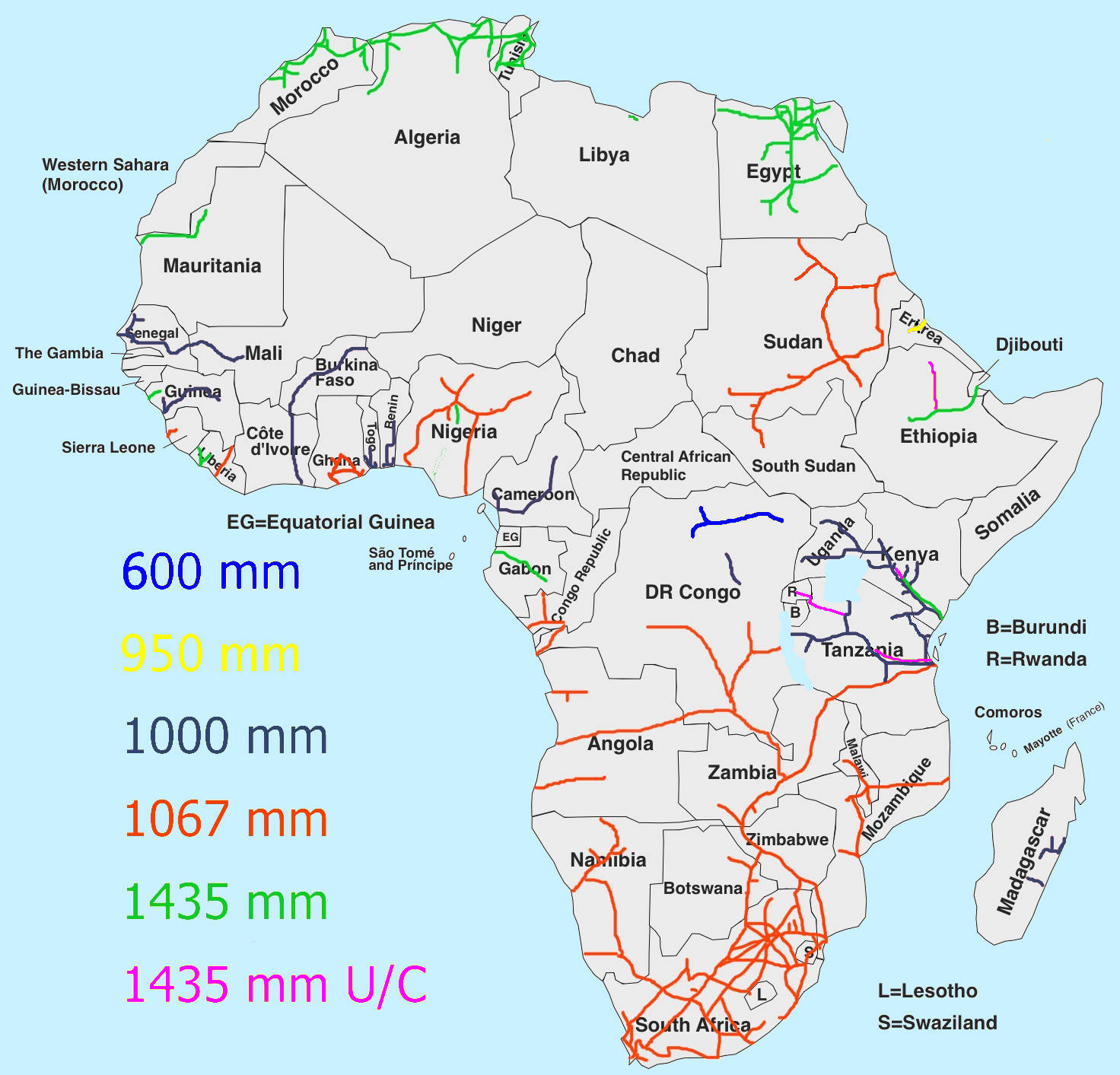
Railway map of Africa

=== Eastern Africa ===
- Djibouti: see Rail transport in Djibouti
- Eritrea: see Rail transport in Eritrea
- Ethiopia: see Rail transport in Ethiopia
- Kenya: see Rail transport in Kenya
- Rwanda: see Rail transport in Rwanda
- Somalia: see Rail transport in Somalia
- South Sudan: see Rail transport in South Sudan
- Tanzania: see Rail transport in Tanzania
- Uganda: see Rail transport in Uganda

=== Indian Ocean States ===
- Madagascar: see Rail transport in Madagascar
- Mauritius: see Rail transport in Mauritius
- Réunion: see Transport in Réunion
- Seychelles: see Transport in Seychelles

=== Middle Africa ===
- Cameroon: see Rail transport in Cameroon
- Central African Republic: see Transport in the Central African Republic
- Chad: see Rail transport in Chad
- Democratic Republic of the Congo: see Rail transport in the Democratic Republic of the Congo
- Republic of the Congo: see Rail transport in the Republic of the Congo
- Equatorial Guinea: see Rail transport in Equatorial Guinea
- Gabon: see Rail transport in Gabon
- São Tomé and Príncipe: see Transport in São Tomé and Príncipe

=== Northern Africa ===
- Algeria: see Rail transport in Algeria
- Egypt: see Rail transport in Egypt
- Libya: see Rail transport in Libya
- Morocco: see Rail transport in Morocco
- Sudan: see Rail transport in Sudan
- Tunisia: see Rail transport in Tunisia
- Western Sahara: see Transport in Western Sahara

=== Southern Africa ===
- Angola: see Rail transport in Angola
- Botswana: see Rail transport in Botswana
- Eswatini: see Eswatini Railways
- Lesotho: see Rail transport in Lesotho
- Malawi: see Rail transport in Malawi
- Mozambique: see Mozambique Ports and Railways
- Namibia: see Rail transport in Namibia
- South Africa: see Rail transport in South Africa
- Zambia: see Rail transport in Zambia
- Zimbabwe: see Rail transport in Zimbabwe

=== Western Africa ===
- Benin: see Rail transport in Benin
- Burkina Faso: see Rail transport in Burkina Faso
- Cape Verde: There is no rail transport in Cape Verde.
- The Gambia: see Transport in The Gambia
- Ghana: see Rail transport in Ghana
- Guinea: see Rail transport in Guinea
- Guinea-Bissau: see Transport in Guinea-Bissau
- Ivory Coast: see Rail transport in Ivory Coast
- Liberia: see Railways in Liberia
- Mali: see Rail transport in Mali
- Mauritania: see Rail transport in Mauritania
- Niger: see Rail transport in Niger
- Nigeria: see Rail transport in Nigeria
- Saint Helena: see Transport on Saint Helena
- Senegal: see Rail transport in Senegal
- Sierra Leone: see Rail transport in Sierra Leone
- Togo: see Rail transport in Togo

== Asia ==
=== East Asia ===
- China: see Rail transport in China
  - Hong Kong: see Rail transport in Hong Kong
  - Macau: see Rail transport in Macau
- Japan: see Rail transport in Japan
- Mongolia: see Rail transport in Mongolia
- North Korea: see Rail transport in North Korea
- South Korea: see Rail transport in South Korea
- Taiwan: see Rail transport in Taiwan

=== Central Asia ===
- Kazakhstan: see Rail transport in Kazakhstan
- Kyrgyzstan: see Rail transport in Kyrgyzstan
- Tajikistan: see Rail transport in Tajikistan
- Turkmenistan: see Rail transport in Turkmenistan
- Uzbekistan: see Rail transport in Uzbekistan

=== South Asia ===
- Afghanistan: see Rail transport in Afghanistan
- Bangladesh: see Rail transport in Bangladesh
- Bhutan: see Rail transport in Bhutan
- British Indian Ocean Territory: see Rail transport in the British Indian Ocean Territory
- India: see Rail transport in India
- Nepal: see Rail transport in Nepal
- Pakistan: see Rail transport in Pakistan
- Sri Lanka: see Rail transport in Sri Lanka

=== Southeast Asia ===
- Brunei: see Rail transport in Brunei
- Cambodia: see Rail transport in Cambodia
- Indonesia: see Rail transport in Indonesia
- Laos: see Rail transport in Laos
- Malaysia: see Rail transport in Malaysia
- Myanmar: see Rail transport in Myanmar
- Philippines: see Rail transportation in the Philippines
- Singapore: see Rail transport in Singapore
- Thailand: see Rail transport in Thailand
- Timor-Leste: see Rail transport in Timor-Leste
- Vietnam: see Rail transport in Vietnam

=== Western Asia ===
- Abkhazia: see Rail transport in Abkhazia
- Armenia: see Rail transport in Armenia
- Azerbaijan: see Rail transport in Azerbaijan
- Bahrain: see Rail transport in Bahrain
- Cyprus: see Cyprus Government Railway
- Georgia: see Rail transport in Georgia
- Iran: see Rail transport in Iran
- Iraq: see Rail transport in Iraq
- Israel: see Rail transport in Israel
- Jordan: see Rail transport in Jordan
- Kuwait: see Rail transport in Kuwait
- Lebanon: see Rail transport in Lebanon
- Northern Cyprus: see Cyprus Government Railway
- Oman: see Rail transport in Oman
- Palestine: see Rail transport in Palestine
- Qatar: see Rail transport in Qatar
- Saudi Arabia: see Rail transport in Saudi Arabia
- Syria: see Rail transport in Syria
- Turkey: see Rail transport in Turkey
- United Arab Emirates: see Rail transport in the United Arab Emirates
- Yemen: see Rail transport in Yemen

== Europe ==
=== Central Europe ===
- Czech Republic: see Rail transport in the Czech Republic
- Germany: see Rail transport in Germany
- Hungary: see Rail transport in Hungary
- Liechtenstein: see Rail transport in Liechtenstein
- Poland: see Rail transport in Poland
- Slovakia: see Rail transport in Slovakia
- Slovenia: see Rail transport in Slovenia
- Switzerland: see Rail transport in Switzerland

=== Eastern Europe ===
- Belarus: see Rail transport in Belarus
- Moldova: see Rail transport in Moldova
- Russia: see Rail transport in Russia
- Ukraine: see Rail transport in Ukraine

=== Northern Europe ===
- Denmark: see Rail transport in Denmark
- Estonia: see Rail transport in Estonia
- Finland: see Rail transport in Finland
- Iceland: see Rail transport in Iceland
- Latvia: see Rail transport in Latvia
- Lithuania: see Rail transport in Lithuania
- Norway: see Rail transport in Norway
- Sweden: see Rail transport in Sweden

=== Southern Europe ===
- Albania: see Rail transport in Albania
- Andorra: see Rail transport in Andorra
- Bosnia and Herzegovina: see Rail transport in Bosnia and Herzegovina
- Bulgaria: see Rail transport in Bulgaria
- Croatia: see Rail transport in Croatia
- Cyprus: see Cyprus Government Railway
- Greece: see Railways of Greece
- Italy: see Rail transport in Italy
- Kosovo: see Rail transport in Kosovo
- Malta: see Malta Railway
- Montenegro: see Railways of Montenegro
- North Macedonia: see Rail transport in North Macedonia
- Portugal: see Rail transport in Portugal
- Romania: see Rail transport in Romania
- Serbia: see Rail transport in Serbia
- Spain: see Rail transport in Spain
- Vatican City: see Rail transport in Vatican City

=== Western Europe ===
- Belgium: see Rail transport in Belgium
- France: see Rail transport in France
- Luxembourg: see Rail transport in Luxembourg
- Monaco: see Rail transport in Monaco
- Netherlands: see Rail transport in the Netherlands, Trains in the Netherlands
- Republic of Ireland: see Rail transport in Ireland
- United Kingdom: see Rail transport in United Kingdom and Commuter rail in the United Kingdom
  - For Great Britain: see Rail transport in Great Britain
  - For Northern Ireland: see Rail transport in Ireland
  - Isle of Man: see Rail transport in the Isle of Man

== North America ==
=== Caribbean ===
- Antigua and Barbuda: See Rail transport in Antigua and Barbuda
- The Bahamas: See Rail transport in the Bahamas
- Barbados: See Rail transport in Barbados
- Cuba: See Rail transport in Cuba
- Dominica: See Transport in Dominica Rail transport in Dominica
- Dominican Republic: See Rail transport in the Dominican Republic
- Grenada: See Rail transport in Grenada
- Haiti: See Rail transport in Haiti
- Jamaica: See Rail transport in Jamaica
- Puerto Rico: see Rail transport in Puerto Rico
- Saint Kitts and Nevis: See Rail transport in Saint Kitts and Nevis
- Saint Lucia: See Rail transport in Saint Lucia
- Saint Vincent and the Grenadines: See Rail transport in Saint Vincent and the Grenadines
- Trinidad and Tobago: See Transport in Trinidad and Tobago

=== Central America ===
- Belize: see Rail transport in Belize
- Costa Rica: see Rail transport in Costa Rica
- El Salvador: see Rail transport in El Salvador
- Guatemala: see Rail transport in Guatemala
- Honduras: see Rail transport in Honduras
- Nicaragua: see Rail transport in Nicaragua
- Panama: see Rail transport in Panama

=== Northern America ===
- Bermuda: see Rail transport in Bermuda, private automobiles were not allowed.
- Canada: see Rail transport in Canada
- Mexico: see Rail transport in Mexico
- United States: see Rail transportation in the United States

== Oceania ==
- Australia: see Rail transport in Australia
- Nauru: see Rail transport in Nauru
- Fiji: see Rail transport in Fiji
- New Zealand: see Rail transport in New Zealand

Railways also existed in New Caledonia, Makatea, New Guinea, Saipan and Banaba.

== South America ==
- Argentina: see Rail transport in Argentina
- Bolivia: see Rail transport in Bolivia
- Brazil: see Rail transport in Brazil
- Chile: see Rail transport in Chile
- Colombia: see Rail transport in Colombia
- Ecuador: see Rail transport in Ecuador
- French Guiana: see Transport in French Guiana
- Guyana: see Transport in Guyana
- Paraguay: see Rail transport in Paraguay
- Peru: see Rail transport in Peru
- Suriname: see Transport in Suriname
- Uruguay: see Rail transport in Uruguay
- Venezuela: see Rail transport in Venezuela
- Falkland Islands: see Camber Railway for former railway

== See also ==
- High-speed rail
- List of countries by rail transport network size
- List of countries by rail usage
- Railway coupling by country
- List of locomotive builders
- List of railway companies
- List of rolling stock manufacturers
- List of track gauges
- List of tram manufacturers
- Transportation engineering
- Rail transport
