= Arenaways (2006-2011) =

Italian railway operator

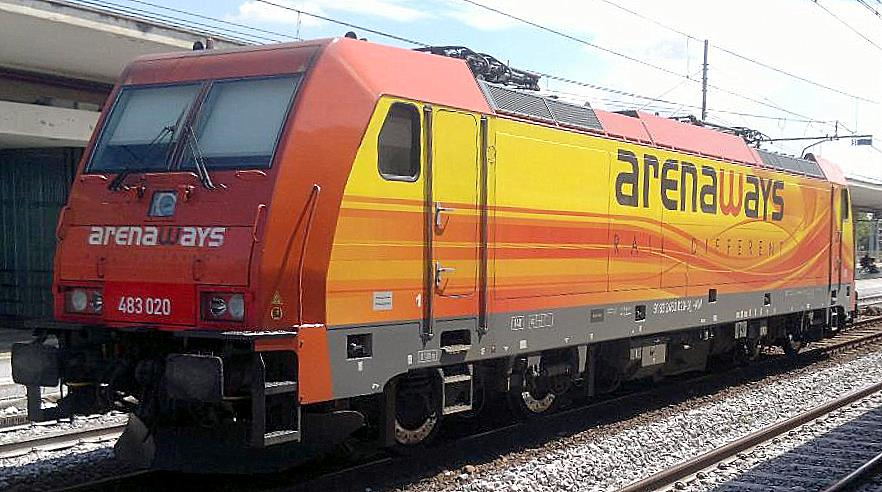
- Traxx
- Industry: Rail transport
- Founded: 2006
- Founder: Giuseppe Arena
- Defunct: 2011
- Services: Passenger service
- Number of employees: over 60 (2011)

Arenaways was a railway operator in Italy. It began open-access passenger operations between Milan and Turin in November 2010, competing with national monopoly operator Trenitalia. Arenaways was running the first private passenger-carrying rail services since nationalisation, and intended to complain to the competition authority about the dominance of Trenitalia.

Arenaways used Bombardier Traxx locomotives, and passenger coaches built by Astra Vagoane Călători. The company offered a number of novel on-board services.
