= Third Railway Package =

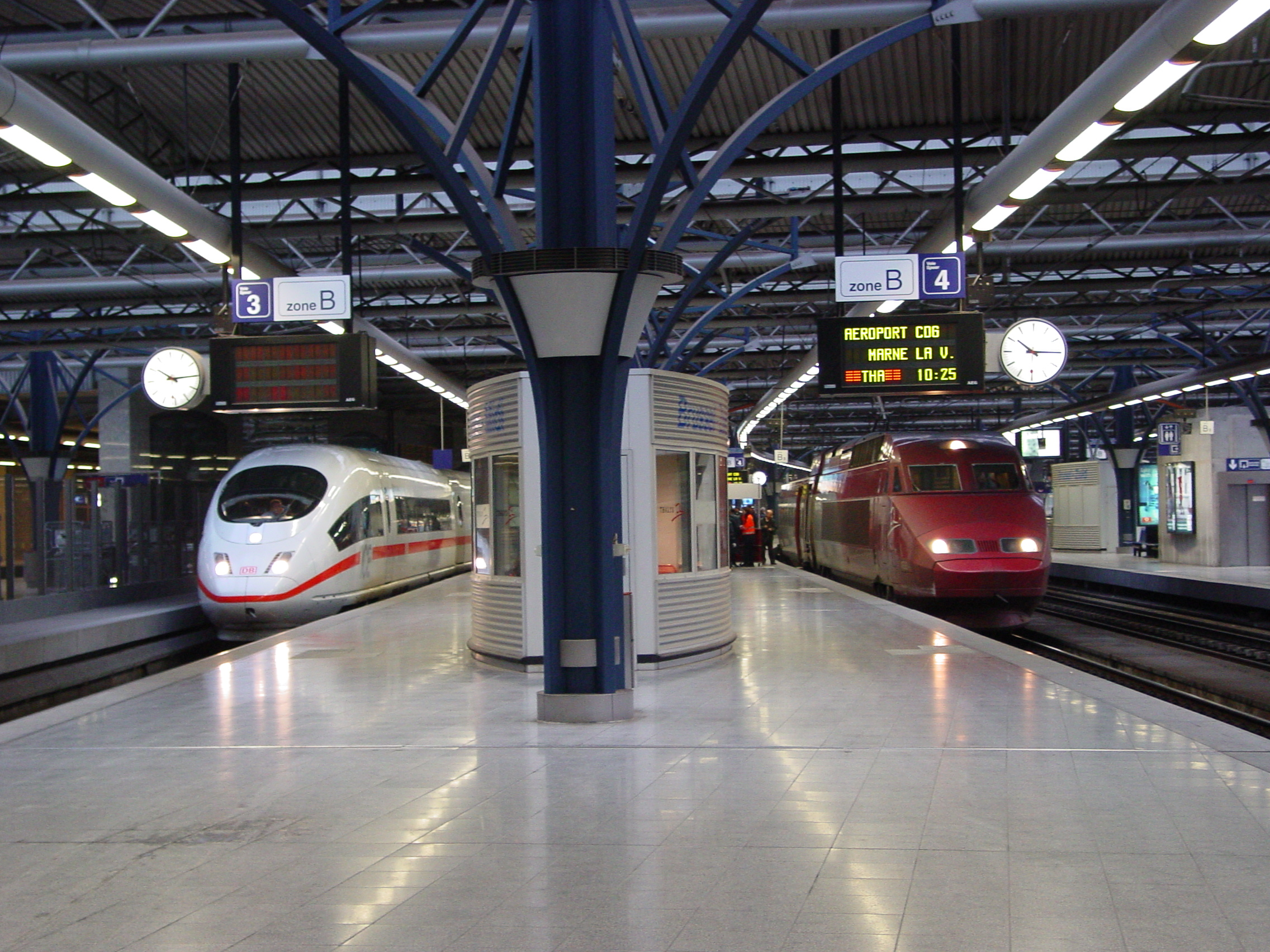
International trains at Brussels Midi station: ICE 3 and Thalys.

The third railway package is a collection of European Union legislation, intended to revitalise railways across Europe and open up passenger services to competition.

Following on from the second railway package, the main act of the third railway package was open access for all international passenger services, including cabotage, across the railways of the EU from 1 January 2010. However, there were also reforms to rail passengers' rights (including a minimum level of compensation for delays); this applies to both international and domestic rail travel, but national governments can exempt some domestic services from this in the medium term. and harmonisation of train drivers licences.

The third railway package reflects the 2001 white paper, "European transport policy for 2010", but much detailed discussion and negotiation was needed to agree the various provisions.

The legislation is hoped to stimulate new and improved rail services across Europe. A progress report is expected to be submitted in 2012, which may stimulate further liberalisation, particularly for domestic rather than international rail services.

== Legislation ==
- Directive 2007/58/EC, on open access
- Directive 2007/59/EC, on harmonised licenses for train drivers
- Regulation 1370/2007 on open access, and subsidised public services
- Regulation 1371/2007 on rail passengers rights

This European legislation has been mirrored by local laws in individual countries of the EU; for instance, the Railways Infrastructure (Access and Management) (Amendment) Regulations 2009 in the UK.

== See also ==
- ERTMS - A pan-European signalling system being promoted by the EU.
- EU Directive 91/440: The First Railway Package
- European Railway Agency
- Rail transport in Europe
- Second railway package
- Fourth railway package
