= Second Railway Package =

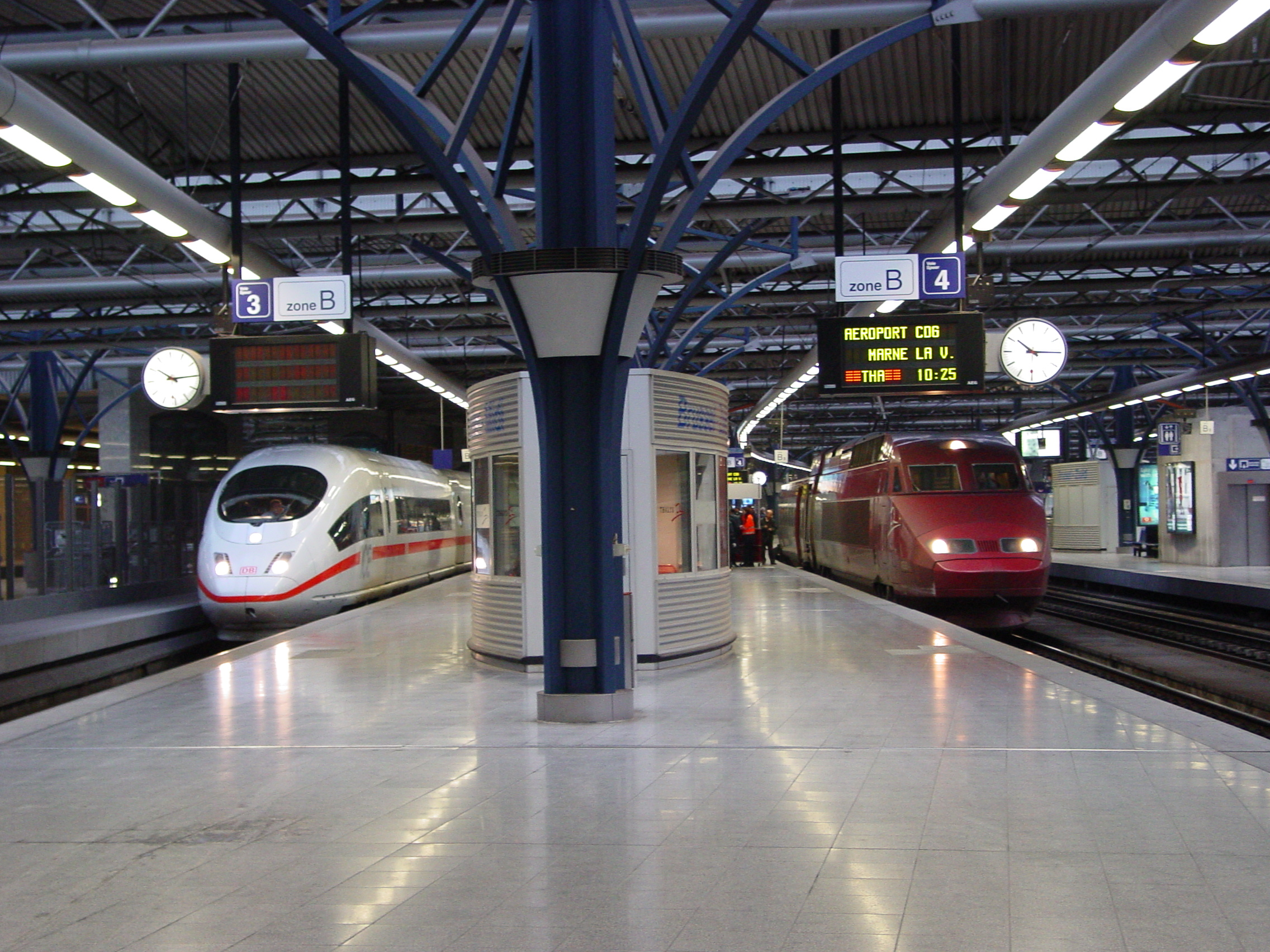
International trains at Brussels Midi station: ICE 3 and Thalys.

The Second Railway Package is a group of European Union legislation which promote common standards and open access, working towards an integrated European railway area.

== History ==
For much of the 20th century, rail transport in Europe was dominated by national monopolies; these effectively excluded competitors from their networks. Starting in 1991, the EU developed legislation to open railways up to competition, which would help them regain modal share from road and air transport.

== Legislation ==
=== Directive 2004/49/EC ===
2004/49/EC is the Railway Safety Directive; it has since been amended by Directive 2008/110/EC. It harmonised safety principles, including procedures for granting safety approval to railway operators and infrastructure owners.

=== Directive 2004/50/EC ===
Directive 2004/50/EC harmonised interoperability requirements, particularly for high-speed rail. It amended Directives 96/48 and 2001/16; it has since been updated by 2008/57/EC.

=== Directive 2004/51/EC ===
Directive 2004/51/EC allowed open access for freight services, nationally and internationally, starting in January 2007

=== Regulation (EC) 881/2004 ===
Regulation 881/2004 created the European Railway Agency, to coordinate safety and interoperability efforts.

== See also ==
- EU Directive 91/440: The First Railway Package
- ERTMS - A pan-European signalling system being promoted by the EU.
- European Railway Agency
- Rail transport in Europe
- Third railway package
- Fourth railway package
