= Single European Railway Directive 2012 =

EU Directive

The Single European Railway Directive 2012 (2012/34/EU) is an EU Directive that regulates railway networks in European Union law. This recast the First Railway Directive 91/440/EEC and consolidates legislation from each of the first to the fourth "Package" from 1991 to 2016, and allows open access operations on railway lines by companies other than those that own the rail infrastructure. The legislation was extended by further directives to include cross border transit of freight.

In September 2010, the process of merging the directives into a single piece of legislation was begun, with the addition of modifications to strengthen the regulatory framework. The Second Railway Package, the Third Railway Package, and the Fourth Railway Package aim to push integration further.

== Background ==
In many countries in Europe, the railway systems developed as separate privately owned companies operating regional networks, such as in the United Kingdom, France, Ireland, or Germany. Rail companies with permission to construct and operate a line were granted or instructed by government legislation, or by royal decree or license. During the 20th century the railways became organised and run through a countrywide organisation. For example, often through nationalisation, British Railways was created in 1948, France's SNCF was established in 1938, Deutsche Reichsbahn was created through the merger of individual German state railways in 1920, and RENFE and FEVE in Spain were created under the Franco government. These entities, in general, had total or virtual monopolies. (Note: Specifically in terms of mainline workings, small industrial railways continued to exist in large industrial complexes such as mines and steelworks.)

These national companies were vertically integrated organisations and it was difficult or impossible for private or regional enterprises to run their own trains on the national networks, or to operate in other EU countries' railway systems. To ensure that rail passengers were offered the possibility to travel more freely around Europe, particularly in cross-border or long-distance journeys, the European Union (or the European Community) legislated in a series of "packages" of legislation to integrate railway systems:

1. the Railway Development Directive 91/440/EC was passed in 1991 to require that infrastructure accounts had to be kept separately from train operating accounts, and that companies were able to apply for non-discriminatory track access (running powers) on a European Union country's track. The Railway Infrastructure Directive 2001/14/EC set out minimum standards for rail networks to allow access, and recover charges on fair terms. The Railway Licensing Directive 95/18/EC entitled rail undertakings to apply for a licence where they were established in any member state. Together this later became known as the "First Railway Package";
2. in 2004, a Railway Safety Directive 2004/49, an Interoperability Directive 2004/50, a Freight Directive 2004/51 and a European Union Agency for Railways Regulation (EC) 881/2004 were passed, known as the Second Railway Package;
3. in 2007, an Open Access Directive 2007/58/EC, a Licences Directive 2007/59/EC, an Open Access Regulation 1370/2007, and a Rail Passenger Rights Regulation 1371/2007 were passed, known as the Third Railway Package;
4. in 2016, a series of six new Directives and Regulations amended the Single European Railway Directive 2012, and recast all other rules, known as the Fourth Railway Package.

Between the third and fourth packages, the Single European Railway Directive 2012/34/EU recast and codified previous legislation on infrastructure separation, licensing, and charging.

== Description ==
The aims of the directive are to create a more efficient rail network by creating greater competition. To achieve this aim member states are required to ensure that organisations operating the infrastructure (track, signalling etc.), and those operating services (trains) are separate and run on a commercial basis. (Note: The legal consequence of this is that companies providing track access and those providing trains are separate, both in terms of management and accounting. ie separate companies) Additionally railway companies from all member states are allowed to run services on any other member states rail infrastructure, both for passenger transport and goods. The free competition provided by the mandate is optional for regional and urban passenger trains.

Further related legislation exists which applies to railway operations that are covered by directive 91/440:

=== Cross border freight in the EU ===
The directive was further clarified and extended by EU directive 2001/12 which initially allowed cross border freight operations on a network of tracks – to be called the Trans European Rail Freight Network (Note: Directive 2001/12/EC of the European Parliament and of the Council, Annex 1, See: maps of the Trans European Rail Freight Network (TERFN) pages 9–25, also see directive 2001/12/EC section 12, Article 10a;) a network which includes ports and freight terminals. (Note: Directive 2001/12/EC of the European Parliament and of the Council, Annex 1, See: list of ports in the TERFN, page 8) The network on which traffic was allowed was to be extended to the whole European network. As a consequence of this new trans-national freight network an additional change was made to the original legislation which required train safety and operating standards (Note: Such standards can be referred to as "Technical Specifications for Interoperability" (TSI) and are set in the EU by the European Railway Agency e.g. see: Technical Specifications for Interoperability (TSI) www.era.europa.eu) to be set out clearly and administered by an organisation that did not run commercial services. The directive also required separate accounting of freight and passenger service revenues and costs.

=== Track allocation and access charges in the EU ===
EU directive 2001/14 set out the framework for the construction of bodies that control and regulate the allocation of line possessions to companies, and the charges for using the track, this directive replaced the previous legislation EU directive 95/19.

=== Licensing of railway companies in the EU ===
EU Directive 95/18 set out a framework and guidelines for the way in which countries of the EU provide licenses to operate to railway companies; a license provided in one member state is generally valid in all other member states. (Note: Provided that the original license was issued for operations in other countries; a change of operating circumstances requires a re-evaluation, or re-application for a license.) The directive was further clarified by EU Directive 2001/13 in 2001.

=== EU Directive 2004/51 ===
EU Directive 2004/51 (part of the Second Railway Package) amended directive 91/440 to include reference to the Trans European Rail Freight Network, and future access by 2007 by licensed rail freight operators of all the European rail network as originally described in directive 2001/12.

== Contents ==
The following summarises the Directive's contents:

- art 1, management of infrastructure and rail, licensing, access charges
- art 2, not for urban or regional services
- art 3, definitions
- art 4, Independence of railway undertakings and infrastructure managers
- art 5, Management of the railway undertakings according to commercial principles
- art 6, separate accounts
- art 7, independence of essential functions of an infrastructure manager
- art 8, financing infrastructure, 5-year strategies, state funding
- art 9(1) bailouts: 'Without prejudice to Union rules on State aid and in accordance with Articles 93, 107 and 108 TFEU, Member States shall set up appropriate mechanisms to help reduce the indebtedness of publicly owned or controlled railway undertakings to a level which does not impede sound financial management and which improves their financial situation.'
- art 10, Conditions of access to railway infrastructure (1) 'Railway undertakings shall be granted, under equitable, non-discriminatory and transparent conditions, the right to access to the railway infrastructure in all Member States for the purpose of operating all types of rail freight services.' (2) and passengers
- art 11, limits on access rights
- art 12, levy on railway undertakings doing passenger services
- art 13(1) 'Infrastructure managers shall supply to all railway undertakings, in a non-discriminatory manner, the minimum access package laid down in point 1 of Annex II.'
- arts 14–15, cross border agreements, Commission monitoring
- art 16, licensing authority in each member state
- art 17–22, licensing requirements
- arts 23–25, license validity and procedure
- arts 26–37, infrastructure access charging
- arts 55–57, each MS should have a single regulator for rail, functions and cooperation
- art 58, Procurement Directive 2004/17/EC
- arts 59–67, final
- Annex I, list of infrastructure items
- Annex II, in access, services to be supplied to railway undertakings
- Annex VI, requirements for costs and charges for access

== Significance ==
Though the original directive was seen by some as a law bringing about privatisation of the railways, there are no requirements in the legislation requiring any level of privatisation. The main aim of the process was the "de-monopolisation" of European railways, with the aim of increasing competitiveness, a process referred to as 'liberalisation'.

There has also been a large increase in the number of private freight providers, many relatively small such as Rail4chem and ERS Railways, but the national companies still control the majority of the traffic. Deutsche Bahn has expanded considerably in the rail freight market, with the purchase of the freight section of the Dutch railway company NS (now DB Schenker Rail Nederland), EWS (UK), and DSB goods (Denmark) amongst others. The French state rail company SNCF also expanded through acquisitions, raising the possibility of trans-national virtual monopolies on rail freight replacing former national monopolies, or a potential duopoly between SNCF and Deutsche Bahn in most of western Europe.

A subsidiary of the British company DB Schenker Rail (UK), EuroCargoRail, operates trains in France and Spain, a situation unlikely prior to the liberalisation.

The increase in cross-border traffic has fuelled demand for multiple voltage electric locomotives such as Bombardier's TRAXX, Siemens's Eurosprinter and electric versions of Alstom's Prima locomotives series.

In passenger transport, large transport corporations have been created, or expanded into the rail market from other related activities such as FirstGroup, Veolia, Serco and Arriva.

In the UK, the directives have been criticised in some areas partly based on the problems with the full privatisation of British Rail, additionally the Trotskyites have claimed that the regulations favour competitive practice which are not necessarily compatible with workers rights.

=== Implementation ===
In the years following the introduction of the mandates different countries implemented them to different extents and at different paces. By 2004, some countries such as the United Kingdom had gone far beyond the original remit privatising the railway system on Great Britain (but not Northern Ireland), others such as Finland and France had created fully separate infrastructure and railway companies from the state-run enterprises; still others, such as Germany, had created separate subsidiaries for different service providers and subsidiaries for infrastructure and track (DB Netz). Yet others merely separated accounting between the two organisational sections. Most countries in the EU still have a state-owned infrastructure company, but many have privatised part or all of their service providers, or are working towards privatisation.

In June 2010, the European Commission instigated legal proceedings through the European Court of Justice against 13 states that had not fully implemented the set of directives (known as the 'first railway package'). The countries not having fully implemented the legislation to the commission's satisfaction were Austria, Czech Republic, Germany, Greece, France, Hungary, Ireland, Italy, Luxembourg, Poland, Portugal, Slovenia and Spain. In 2012, action against Germany and Austria on the basis that their infrastructure and operating companies were insufficiently separate was rejected by the European Court of Justice. Portugal, Spain and Hungary remained as having not yet fully complied with the aspects of the directives. Legal action against Bulgaria was passed to the Court of Justice in 2012 for non-implementation. In February 2013 the European Court of Justice ruled that the governments of Hungary and Spain had failed to liberalise their railways; infrastructure management was not sufficiently separated from train operation.

Ireland had received a derogation for its obligation to implement the legislation until 2012, which allowed for Iarnród Éireann to be retained as the sole rail operator, and a similar situation existed in Northern Ireland. Ireland has currently legally implemented this legislation via the European Union (Regulation of Railways) (Amendment) Regulations 2020, however Iarnród Éireann remains the de-facto sole operator in the Republic of Ireland, with the cross-border Enterprise trains from Dublin to Belfast operated by both Iarnród Éireann and NI Railways.

== See also ==
- Arrangements between railroads – arrangements in gaining track access in other countries
- ERTMS – A pan-European signalling system being promoted by the EU.
- EU Directive 2001/16 – standards for interoperability of rail systems. See: Directive 2001/16/EC of the European Parliament and of the Council 19 March 2001 Interoperability of conventional rail systems eur-lex.europa.eu
- Second Railway Package, related legislation concerning primarily safety and interoperability
- Third railway package
- Fourth railway package
- Milan–Paris Frecciarossa – a railway service operated by Trenitalia France made possible by the directive
