= Rail Vehicle Accessibility Regulations =

UK Statutory Instrument 2010 No. 432

Rail Vehicle Accessibility (Non-Interoperable Rail System) Regulations 2010
- Statutory Instrument
- Parliament of the United Kingdom
- Citation: SI 2010/432

Dates
- Made: 23 February 2010
- Laid before Parliament: 1 March 2010
- Commencement: 6 April 2010

Other legislation
- Repeals/revokes: Rail Vehicle Accessibility Regulations 1998; Rail Vehicle Accessibility (Amendment) Regulations 2000
- Made under: Disability Discrimination Act 1995; European Communities Act 1972; Transport Act 2000

Text of statute as originally enacted

Text of the Rail Vehicle Accessibility (Non-Interoperable Rail System) Regulations 2010 as in force today (including any amendments) within the United Kingdom, from legislation.gov.uk.

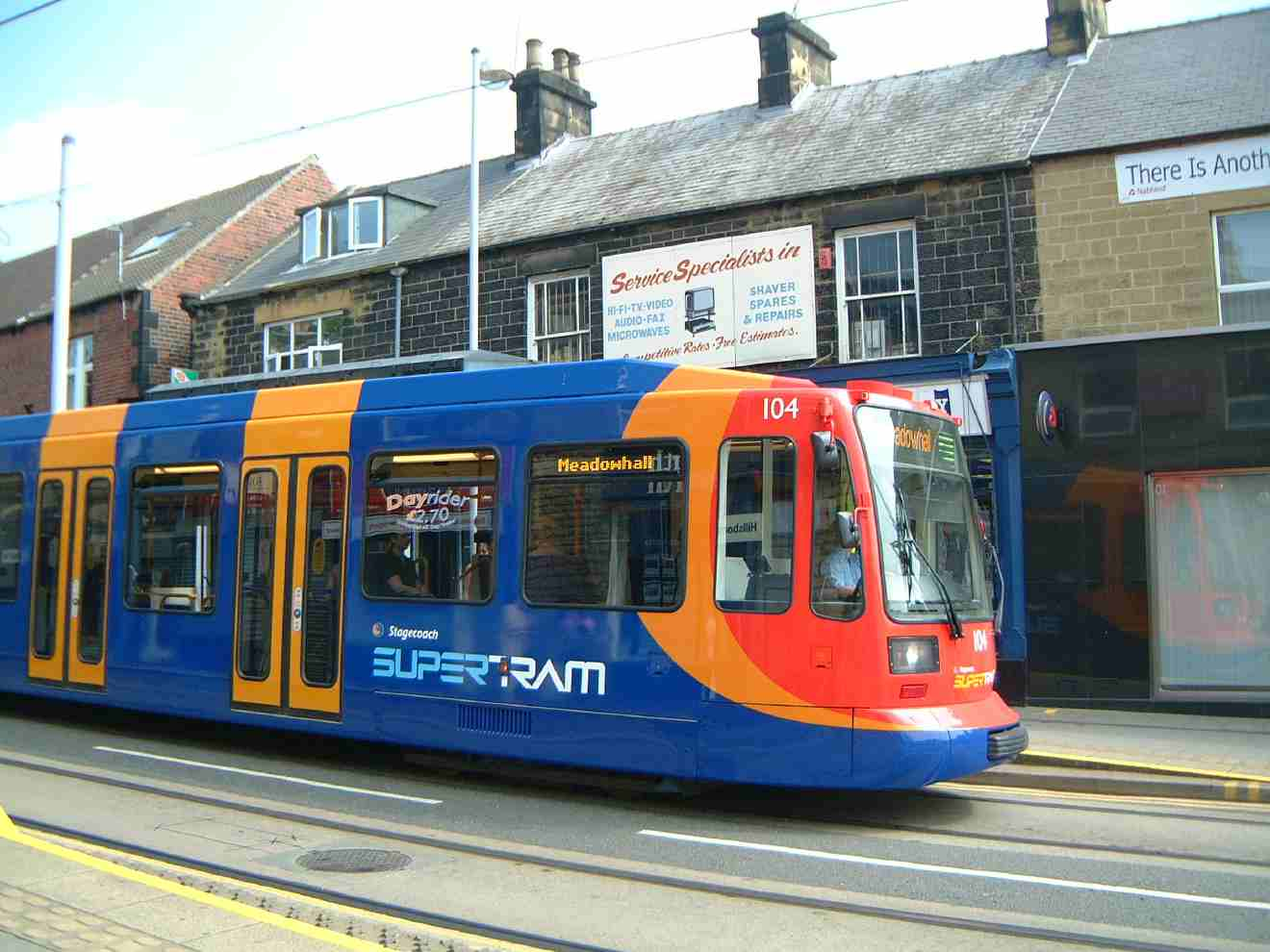
Sheffield Supertram vehicles have orange doors which contrast with the blue bodyside to comply with RVAR.

The Rail Vehicle Accessibility (Non-Interoperable Rail System) Regulations 2010 (SI 2010/432) (commonly known as RVAR 2010) is a statutory instrument in the United Kingdom. It aims to set standards designed to improve accessibility for disabled people on light rail passenger vehicles.

It came into force on 6 April 2010. The instrument exercises powers conferred by the Disability Discrimination Act 1995. It revokes and replaces the Rail Vehicle Accessibility Regulations 1998 (SI 1998/2456).

== Applicability ==
RVAR 2010 sets standards designed to improve accessibility for disabled people on light rail vehicle systems for passengers, including metro, underground and tram systems, which are not subject to the Railways (Interoperability) Regulations 2006 (PRM-TSI). RVAR 2010 does not apply to main line rail systems.

The regulations apply to a rail vehicle (as defined by the instrument) that was first brought into service after 31 December 1998, except if it belongs to a class first brought into use before 1 January 1999.

== Regulated Features ==
RVAR 2010 covers the following areas of a rail vehicle:

- Boarding devices
- Catering
- Doors
- Door controls
- Door handles
- Exterior doorways and through routes
- Interior doorways
- Floors
- Handholds
- Handrails
- Passenger information
- Request-stop controls
- Seats
- Steps
- Toilets
- Transparent surfaces
- Wheelchair spaces

== Key means ==
The instrument aims to provide accessibility by ensuring that:

- exterior doors, steps, floors and handrails contrast strongly visually with adjacent areas of the vehicle.
- door handles, door controls and request-stop controls can be used by the widest range of people.
- handrails are provided at doorways, on seat backs and in toilets.
- nominated doorways are accessible to wheelchairs.
- wheelchair spaces and wide throughways to those spaces from the accessible doorways are provided.
- interior glazed panels are clearly marked to aid visibility (or protected).
- passenger information is clearly communicated, both visually and audibly.
- toilets are provided that are accessible to disabled people, including wheelchair users.
- seats are nominated that are accessible to disabled people.
- catering facilities that are provided are accessible to all.
- boarding devices are provided to allow wheelchair users to enter and leave the vehicle.
