= Fourth Railway Package =

EU law on surface transport

The fourth railway package is a set of changes to rail transport regulation in the European Union law. It covers standards and authorisation for rolling stock; workforce skills; independent management of infrastructure; and the liberalisation of domestic passenger services in an attempt to reduce European rail subsidies.

== Background ==
The fourth railway package attempts to reform railways companies (whether private or public) that are able to raise prices if they dominate both tracks and the trains. Because of scepticism in most countries about the value of liberalisation, the package permits tracks and trains to be owned by a single holding company. The "compliance verification clause" could allow regulators to place sanctions on parts of a vertically integrated rail business which place obstacles in the way of competitors trying to provide services on their network; this would improve competition.

Responsibility for authorising rolling stock to use a network would be shifted away from network owners and towards the European Railway Agency. This is expected to be faster and cheaper.

In 2015, the technical and political pillars of the package were accepted by EU transport ministers and currently the European Commission, Parliament and Council negotiated to reach an agreement on the text of the regulations and were successful. The technical pillar of the fourth railway package has been adopted by the European Commission and approved by the European Parliament in April 2016.

== Legislation ==
The package created or updated six main pieces of EU railway legislation, on the European Union Agency for Railways, the main Single European Railway Directive 2012, and directives on safety, interoperability, and procurement rules. The package is as follows:

1. Regulation (EU) 2016/796 on the European Union Agency for Railways and repealing Regulation (EC) n° 881/2004. to Single European Railway Directive 2012
2. Directive (EU) 2016/797 on the Interoperability Directive 2016/797 on the interoperability of the rail system within the European Union (Recast of Directive 2008/57/EC)
3. Directive (EU) 2016/798 on Railway Safety (Recast of Directive 2004/49/EC).
4. Regulation (EU) 2016/2338 amending Regulation (EU) 1370/2007, which deals with the award of public service Rail Service Contracts for domestic passenger transport services by rail ('PSO Regulation'). a new Railway Safety Directive 2016/798/EU
5. Directive 2016/2370/EU amending Directive 2012/34/EU, which deals with the opening of the market of domestic passengers transport services by rail and the governance of the railway infrastructure('Governance Directive')
6. Regulation (EU) 2016/2337 repealing Regulation (EEC) 1192/69 on the normalisation of the accounts of railways undertaking.

== See also ==
- United Kingdom enterprise law
- ERTMS – A pan-European signalling system being promoted by the EU.
- Single European Railway Directive 2012 (consolidating legislation from the first to fourth package)
- European Railway Agency
- Rail transport in Europe
- Second railway package
- Third railway package
