= Technical Specifications for Interoperability =

European Union regulations for rail network construction

A Technical Specification for Interoperability (abbreviated as TSI) is a text provided for in European Directive 2016/797 adopted by the European Parliament and the Council of the European Union on the interoperability of the European rail system in accordance with the ordinary legislative procedure.

This directive stipulates that the railway system is divided into 8 subsystems:

1. infrastructure
2. Traction energy
3. control command and the trackside signalling
4. control command and the on-board signalling
5. rolling stock
6. Traffic operation and management
7. Maintenance
8. Telematic applications for passenger and freight services.

It also provides that a technical specification for interoperability (TSI) is drawn up for each subsystem.

These TSIs define the essential requirements of the above-mentioned European directives for specific cases and define a set of technical requirements that apply to new subsystems put into service.

These requirements constitute a set of conditions necessary for putting into service, but these conditions are generally not sufficient to guarantee safety, so they must be supplemented by some additional measures. They do not cover all the fields of the regulatory requirements, but for the fields they cover, they prevail over the national texts.

== Legal basis ==
When the first TSIs were published, they still had separate legal bases: one for the interoperability of the high-speed rail system (European Community Directive 96/48/EC) and one for the interoperability of the conventional rail system (European Community Directive 2001/16/EC).

The matters covered by these two directives have been merged and regrouped in the European Community Directive 2008/57/EC, which in turn has been taken over by the European Union Directive 2016/797/EU.

Directive 2008/57/EC was repealed as of 16 June 2020, by which time the new Directive 2016/797/EU had to be transposed into national law.

== Drafting and approval ==
TSIs are drafted by the European Union Agency for Railways on a mandate from the European Commission. The working group set up includes members of the national safety authorities and members of organizations representing the sector.

Once completed, they are submitted to the European Union Member States Committee for its opinion before being decided by the Commission. They are then translated into the official Languages of the European Union before being notified to the Member States.

== Transposition into French law ==
The Interoperability Directive is transposed into French law by Decree 2019-525.

TSIs adopted in the form of a decision by the commission are systematically transposed by decrees (more precisely by the decree of 19 March 2012). TSIs adopted as regulations by the commission are directly applicable by all.
