= European Rail Infrastructure Managers =

Transport industry association

European Rail Infrastructure Managers (EIM)
- Formation: 2002
- Type: sector association
- Purpose: To represent the common interests of the railway infrastructure managers at European level
- Headquarters: Square de Meeûs 1 B-1000-Brussels
- Location: Brussels, Belgium
- Region served: Europe
- Members: Rail infrastructure managers
- Official language: English
- President: Miguel Cruz (Infraestruturas de Portugal)
- Vice Presidents: John Voppen (ProRail); Alain Quinet (SNCF Réseau); Piotr Wyborski (PKP PLK)
- Executive Director: Monika Heiming
- Manager Internal Affairs: Sandrine Roussel
- Website: www.eimrail.org

European Rail Infrastructure Managers (EIM) is a sector association that represents the interests of European rail infrastructure managers. Members consist of owners/managers of infrastructure from most European/EEA countries.

EIM was formally established during 2002 following the liberalisation of the European railway market to promote the interests of independent rail infrastructure managers in the EU and the European Economic Area (EEA). EIM is a founding member of the Platform for European Rail Infrastructure Managers (PRIME), a member of the Group of Representative Bodies, and a member of the Management Board of the European Union Agency for Railways (ERA).

== History and stances ==
EIM was created in 2002 with the principal purpose of providing a single voice to represent its members vis-à-vis the relevant European institutions and sector stakeholders. EIM also assists members in developing their businesses through the sharing of experiences and contributing to the technical and safety activities of the European Union Agency for Railways (ERA).

EIM has periodically engaged with legislators such as with the European Commission during the formulation or alteration of legislation pertaining to the rail sector, typically advocating for the independence of infrastructure managers and measures to promote competitive forces and greater liberalisation. Specifically, it has directly communicated with regulators and legislators on both the technical and operational aspects on the long term deployment plans for the European Rail Traffic Management System (ERTMS) and the Single European Railway Area (SERA) initiative.

Fostering cooperation and coordination between its member infrastructure managers has also been an important activity; EIM has spoken out on the need for future infrastructure deployment schemes to maintain interoperability requirements and to embrace common practices. It has also monitored the benefits of certain programmes, such as the adaption of rail infrastructure to better accommodate climate challenges. EIM had been an advocate of the use of public–private partnerships (PPP). Specifically, it has encouraged the inclusion of private entities in the provision of both services and infrastructure; it has observed several major projects being completed via PPPs, such as the Channel Tunnel, the Öresund Bridge, and LGV Sud Europe Atlantique.

Periodically, EIM has coordinated with other associations, such as the European Railway and Infrastructure Companies, the International Rail Transport Committee, and the International Union of Railways (UIC), towards shared goals such as increased digitalisation within the rail sector.

During late 2013, several reforms were enacted by EIM’s membership; the association’s statutes were altered to permit all rail infrastructure managers to join EIM, regardless of their organisational structure, ownership and size, thus better enabling non-national and private infrastructure managers to participate. Furthermore, EIM endorsed a proposal by the European Commission to establish a European Platform of Rail Infrastructure Managers.

EIM has also promoted the greater use of rail transport as an environmentally-friendly option for fulfilling transport needs and called for the European Parliament to give high priority in future transport policies to promoting a modal shift towards the rail sector in response to climate concerns. During late 2018, EIM gave its public support to the 'Graz Declaration', a political initiative focused on the development of environment-friendly transportation in Europe.

During mid 2020, EIM publicly outlined proposals on how the development and deployment of the Future Railway Mobile Communication System (FRMCS) should be tackled.

== Organisational structure ==
Based in Brussels, EIM is registered as an international, non-profit association under Belgian law. EIM is led by a President and three Vice-Presidents, who are elected for two-year terms. The President, the Vice-Presidents and the Executive Director form the Board of Directors. The General Assembly is the highest and final governance authority of the association. It gathers normally twice per year.

Members meet informally at the highest level to share experiences and discuss matters of common importance at the CEOs Club meetings which usually take place twice per year. The Executive-Director leads the Secretariat which consists of three organizational units employing an international staff of approximately ten people. Members are represented at EIM via the Policy and Management Committee (PMC) for the policy activities and via the Technical Steering Group (TSG) for technical matters.

The PMC and the TSG may be assisted by internal working groups to address specific questions and to monitor special areas of interest. EIM currently has 13 Working Groups whose work is being co-ordinated and supervised by the TSG. The Working Groups frequently interact with their equivalents in the European Union Agency for Railways, which is aiming to create an efficient railway network in Europe by promoting interoperability and common standards for railways.

== Members ==
The following are full members of EIM (voting rights):

- (Spain) - Adif
- (Denmark) - Banedanmark
- (Finland) - Finnish Transport Infrastructure Agency
- (United Kingdom) - High Speed 1
- (Belgium) - Infrabel
- (Norway) - Bane NOR
- (United Kingdom) - Network Rail
- (Netherlands) - ProRail
- (Portugal) - IP
- (France) - SNCF Réseau
- (Sweden) - Trafikverket
- (Poland) - PKP Polskie Linie Kolejowe
- (Republic of Ireland) - Irish Rail

The following are associate members of EIM (no voting rights):

- (United Kingdom) - Getlink (formerly Groupe Eurotunnel)
- (France) - LISEA consortium (consisting of VINCI Concessions (leader), the Caisse des Dépôts with its subsidiary CDC Infrastructure and AXA Private Equity)
- (United Kingdom) - HS2
- (United Kingdom) - Network Rail High-Speed
- (Poland) - CPK

== Activities ==
EIM's main areas of interest include:

EU Policy

- EU regulatory framework for railways: the first, second, third and fourth packages
- EU measures aimed at harmonizing, among others, track access charges (TAC), ERTMS modulated TAC, noise-differentiated charging, framework agreements, access to service facilities
- Proposal for a Fourth Railway Package
- TEN-T and CEF
- Urban Mobility
- Intelligent Transport Systems
- Environment
- White Paper for Transport
- Shift2Rail

Technical issues

- Infrastructure (INF)
- Cross acceptance (XA)
- Operations (OPE)
- ERTMS Change Control Management (ERTMS)
- Persons with Reduced Mobility (PRM)
- Train Detection Compatibility (TDC)
- Safety (SAF)
- Locomotives and Passenger Rolling Stock (LOC&PAS)
- Energy (ENE)
- Security (SEC)
- Telecom (TEL)
- Register of Infrastructure (RINF)
- Telematic Applications for Passengers and Freight (TAP&TAF)

Business

- Asset management
- Development of KPIs
- Digital railways
- Research & Development
