= Rail transport in Europe =

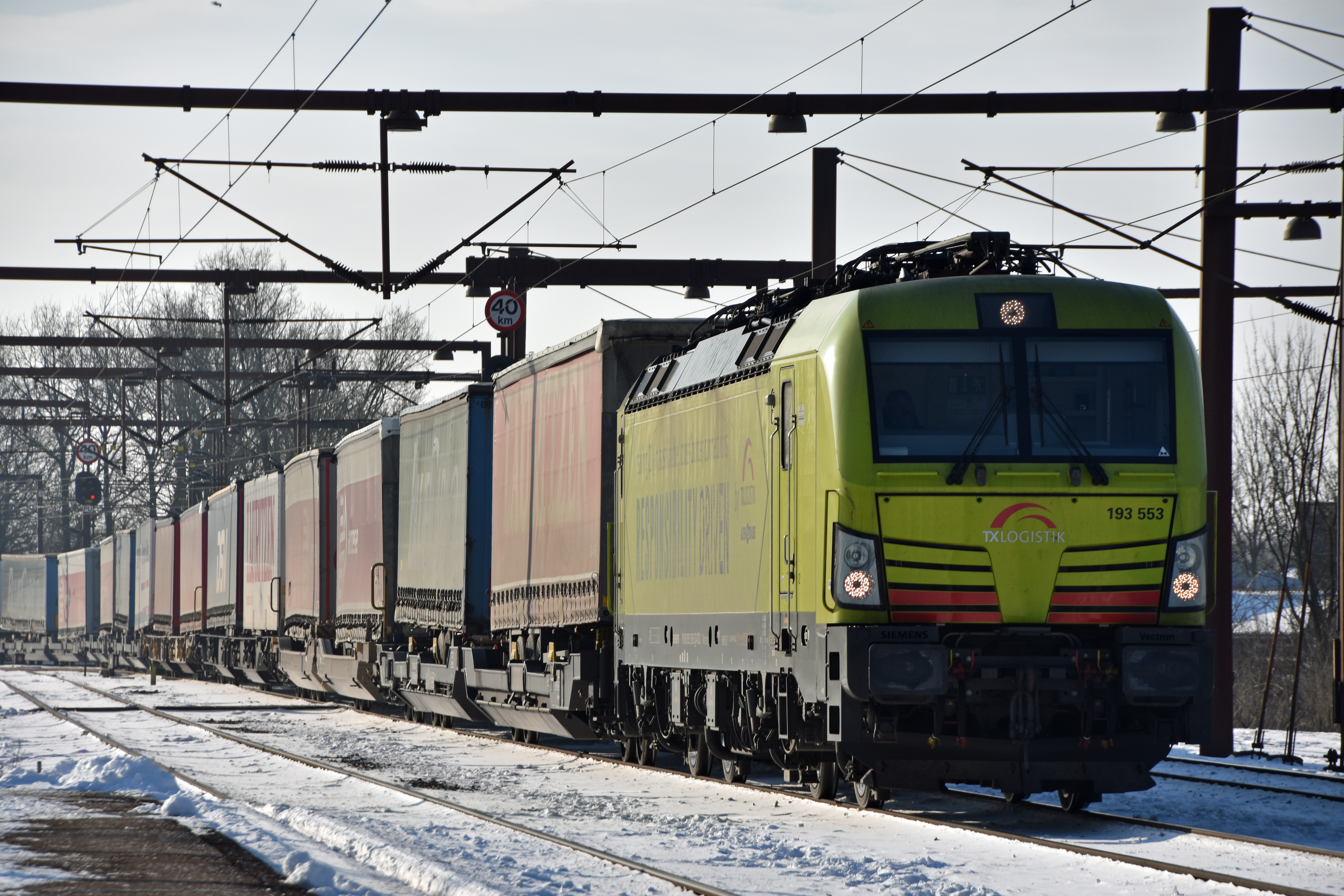
- Multi-system electric locomotive designed for cross-border freight and passenger rail transport

System length
- Electrified: 57% (EU average)

Track gauge
- Main: 1,435 mm / 4 ft 8 1/2 in standard gauge
- High-speed: standard gauge

Electrification
- Main: Mixed (see text)

Features
- Longest tunnel: Gotthard Base Tunnel 57.09 km (35.47 mi)
- Longest bridge: Crimean Bridge 18.1 km (11.25 mi)
- Max elevation: Jungfraujoch at 3,454 m (11,332 ft)
- Min elevation: Privolzhskaya Railway (Volga Railway) at ca. −28 m (−92 ft)

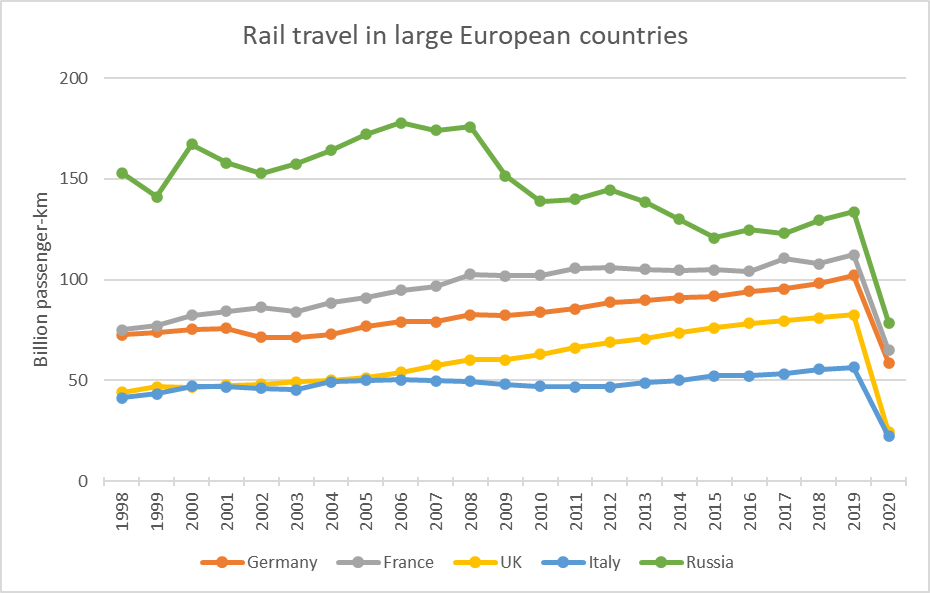
Passenger-km in the five largest European countries from 1998 to 2020 (drop in 2020 is due to the COVID-19 pandemic)

Rail transport in Europe has diverse technological standards, operating concepts, and infrastructures. Common features are the widespread use of standard-gauge rail, high operational safety and a high proportion of electrification. Electrified railway networks in Europe operate at many different voltages, both AC and DC, varying from 750 to 25,000 volts, and signaling systems vary from country to country, complicating cross-border traffic.

The European Union (EU) aims to make cross-border operations easier as well as to introduce competition to national rail networks. EU member states were empowered to separate the provision of transport services and the management of the infrastructure by the Single European Railway Directive 2012. Usually, national railway companies were split into separate divisions or independent companies for infrastructure, passenger and freight operations. The passenger operations may be further divided into long-distance and regional services, because regional services often operate under public service obligations (which maintain services which are not economically interesting to private companies but nonetheless produce societal benefit), while long-distance services often operate without subsidies.

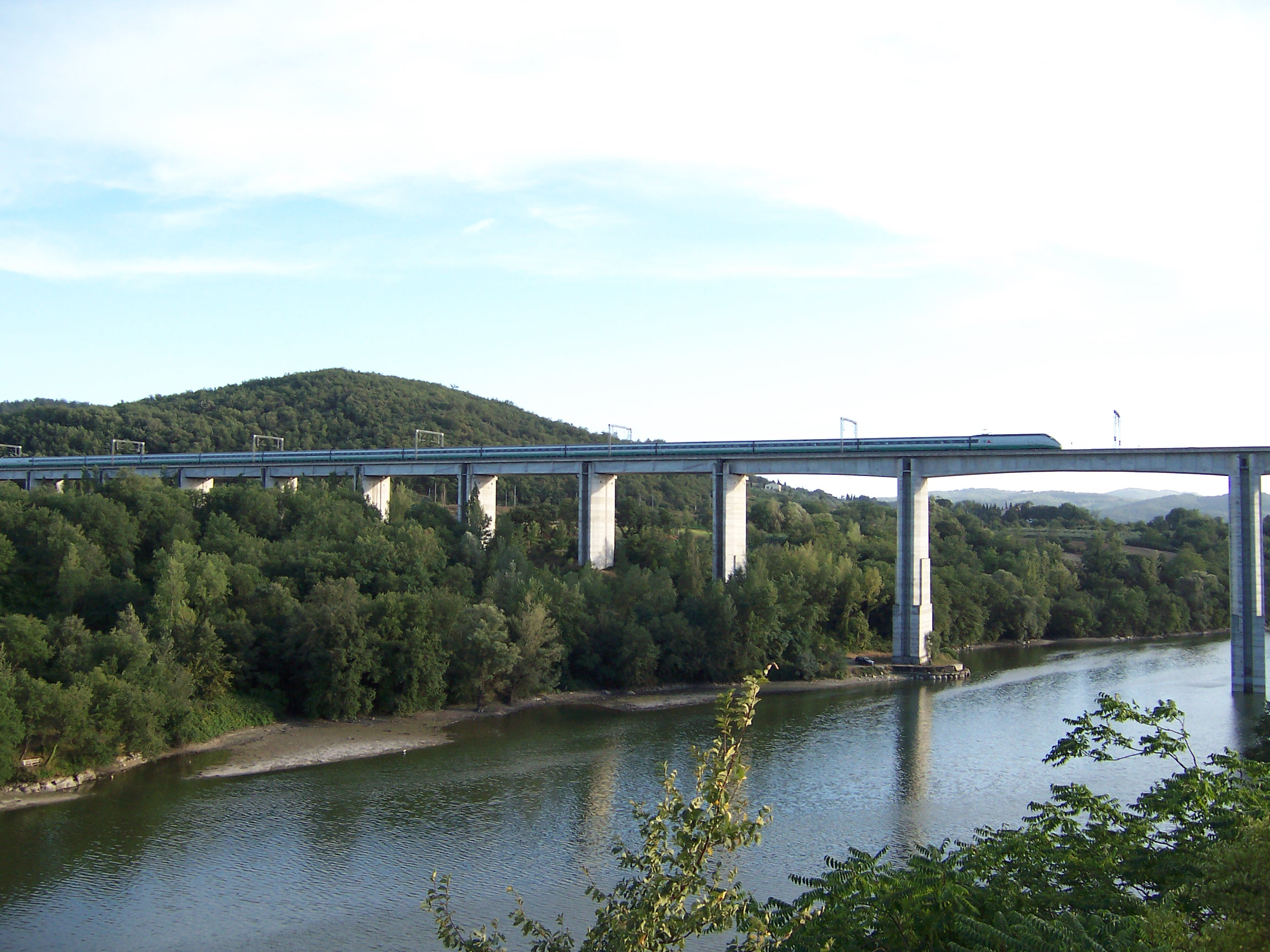
An ETR 500 train running on the Florence–Rome high-speed line near Arezzo, the first high-speed railway opened in Europe

Across the EU, passenger rail transport saw a 50% increase between 2021 and 2022, with the 2022 passenger-kilometers figure being slightly under that of 2019 (i.e. before the COVID-19 pandemic). The trend is expected to continue and rapid investments in European Union railways are under way.

Switzerland is the European leader in kilometres traveled by rail per inhabitant and year, followed by Austria and France among EU countries. In 2024, the Italian national rail service Trenitalia was recognized as the best rail passenger operator in Europe.

Nearly all European countries have operational railway lines, the only exceptions being Andorra (which never had one), Cyprus, Iceland, Malta and San Marino (whose single or multiple railway lines were either entirely or mostly dismantled). Despite having operational railway lines, Liechtenstein, Monaco and Vatican City do not have their own national railway companies due to their small size and network. Their railways are instead operated by their larger neighbours (Austria, France and Italy, respectively). Russia, Germany and France have the longest railway networks in Europe. Apart from the islands of Great Britain, Ireland and Denmark, operational island railways are also present on Corsica, Isle of Man, Mallorca, Sardinia, Sicily and Wangerooge.

Public transport timetables, including rail, are amended yearly, usually on the second Sunday of December and June, respectively. The European Rail Timetable publishes rail schedules for all European countries.

Eurail and Interrail are both rail passes for international rail travel in Europe for tourists.

== History ==
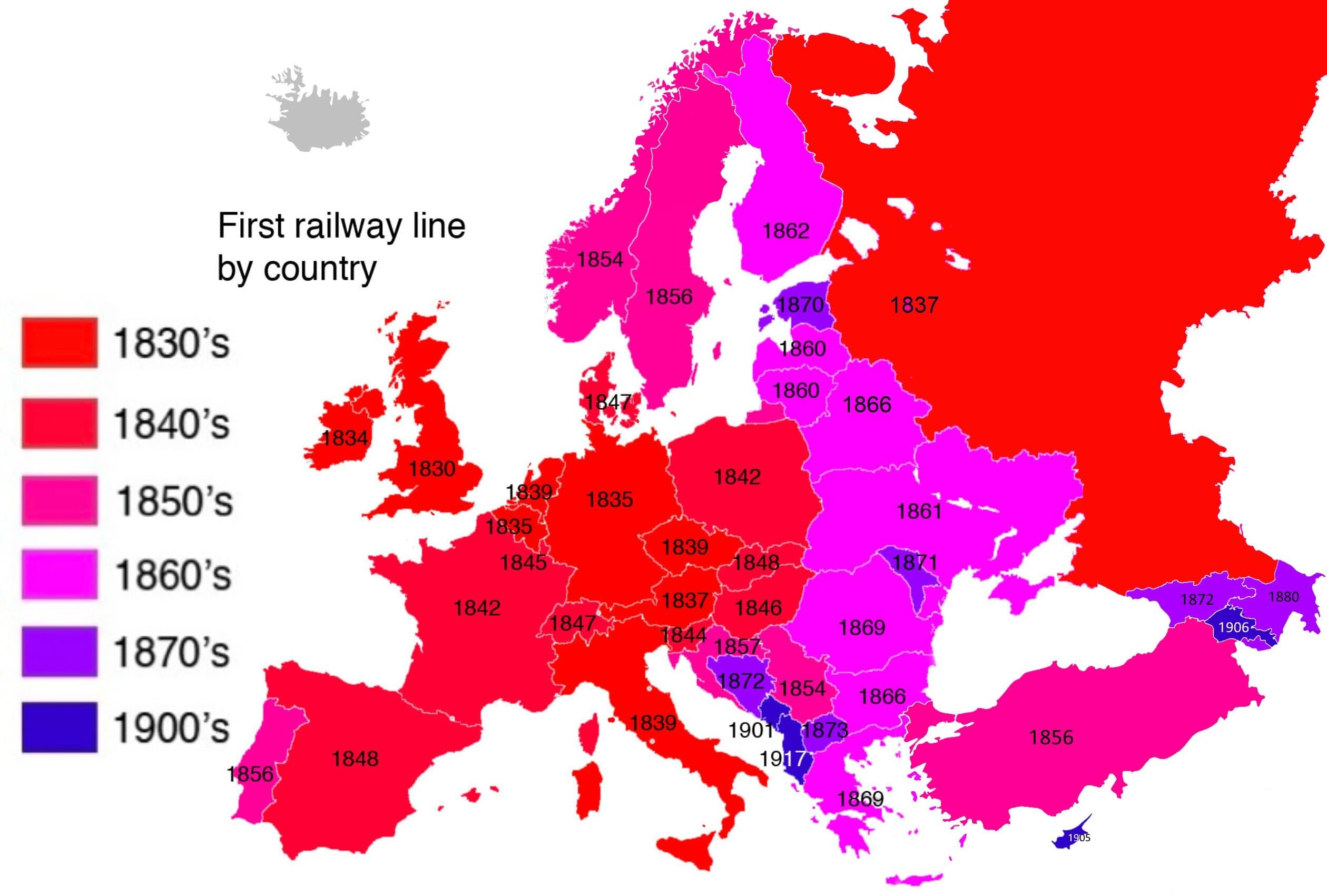
First railway line by country

Europe was the epicenter of rail transport and has today one of the densest networks (an average of 46 km (29 mi) for every 1,000 km^{2} (390 sq mi) in the EU as of 2013). Because of its history, European railway systems often differ between countries regarding their main line track gauges, loading gauges, electrification systems and platform heights, among others (see below).

Interoperability on its conventional network and further development of its high-speed network are current issues.

== Differences between countries ==
The 2017 European Railway Performance Index ranked the performance of national rail systems as follows:

1. Tier One: Switzerland, Denmark, Finland, Germany, Austria, Sweden, and France.
2. Tier Two: Great Britain, Netherlands, Luxembourg, Spain, Czech Republic, Norway, Belgium, and Italy.
3. Tier Three: Lithuania, Slovenia, Ireland, Hungary, Latvia, Slovakia, Poland, Portugal, Romania, and Bulgaria.

=== Rail gauge ===
Most railways in Europe use 1,435 mm (4 ft 8 1/2 in) standard gauge, while in some other countries, like on the Iberian Peninsula, or countries whose territories used to be part of the Russian Empire or Soviet Union, widespread broad gauge exists (except Southeastern European countries). For instance, Eastern European countries like Russia, Ukraine, Armenia, Moldova, Belarus, Finland, and the Baltic states (Estonia, Latvia, Lithuania) use a gauge width of 1,520 mm (4 ft 11 27/32 in) or 1,524 mm (5 ft), also known as Russian gauge. Spain and Portugal both use the 1,668 mm (5 ft 5 21/32 in) track gauge, also known as the Iberian gauge. Ireland uses the somewhat unusual 5 ft 3 in (1,600 mm) gauge, referred to in Ireland as "Irish Gauge" (but is an island with no external cross-border links). There are also many narrow-gauge railways in Europe, especially in mountainous regions.

There are different technical solutions whenever a break of gauge occurs. Between Eastern European countries that use standard gauge and Belarus and Ukraine, the bogies of passenger trains are exchanged in a time consuming procedure. For the Rail Baltica project, a new international standard gauge railway is currently built that connects the Baltic states with the European standard gauge network. In some places, trains with variable gauge bogies are used, such as between France and Spain (also used between narrow and standard gauge railways, for example the GoldenPass Express in Switzerland). Some lines have dual gauge in place. European high-speed railway lines outside of Russia are all built in standard gauge.

=== Left-hand vs. right-hand traffic ===
Handedness of rail traffic in Europe: Right-hand traffic Left-hand traffic Only single-track No railway

While most European countries use right-hand traffic on double-track railway lines, some have left-hand traffic. Liechtenstein, San Marino and Vatican City have single-track railways.

Left-hand traffic	Right-hand traffic
Belgium | France | Great Britain | Ireland | Italy | Monaco | Portugal | Slovenia | Sweden | Switzerland	Albania | Armenia | Austria | Azerbaijan | Belarus | Bosnia and Herzegovina | Bulgaria | Croatia | Czech Republic | Denmark | Estonia | Finland | Georgia | Germany | Greece | Hungary | Kosovo | Latvia | Lithuania | Luxembourg | Moldova | Montenegro | Netherlands | North Macedonia | Norway | Poland | Romania | Russia | Serbia | Slovakia | Spain | Turkey | Ukraine

=== Electrification system ===
Electrification systems: not valid (not in Europe or no railways) 750 V DC 1.5 kV DC 3 kV DC 15 kV AC 25 kV AC High speed lines in France, Spain, Italy, United Kingdom, the Netherlands, Belgium and Turkey operate under 25 kV, as do high power lines in the states of the former Soviet Union.

The percentage of electrification of lines varies between countries. Nearly 57% of railway lines in the European Union are electrified, whereas in Switzerland about 99% are electrified.

Likewise, the electrification systems of lines varies between countries. 15 kV AC has been used in Germany, Austria, Liechtenstein, Switzerland, Norway and Sweden since 1912, while the Netherlands and France use 1500 V DC. France, most of England, Wales, Portugal, Lithuania, most of Southeastern Europe (Hungary, Croatia, Serbia, Bosnia and Herzegovina, Montenegro, Kosovo, North Macedonia, Greece, Bulgaria, Romania) and Turkey (also parts of the Czech Republic, Slovakia and Ukraine) use 25 kV AC, while Spain, Belgium, Poland, Italy, Slovenia, Moldova, the South Caucasus (Armenia, Azerbaijan, Georgia) and Russia (also parts of the Czech Republic, Slovakia and Ukraine) use 3 kV DC. As of 2024, railway lines in Albania are not electrified and the same is true for most lines in Ireland and the greater part of Scotland. All this makes the construction of truly pan-European vehicles a challenging task and, until recent developments in locomotive construction, was mostly ruled out as being impractical and too expensive.

The development of an integrated European high-speed rail network is overcoming some of these differences. All high-speed lines outside of Russia, including those built in Spain and Portugal, use 1,435 mm (4 ft 8 1/2 in) standard gauge tracks. Likewise all European high-speed lines, outside of Germany, Austria and Italy use 25 kV AC electrification (Electrification of high-speed rail in Italy is mixed 3 kV DC and 25 kV AC). This means that by 2020, high-speed trains can travel from Italy to the United Kingdom, or Portugal to the Netherlands without the need for multi-voltage systems or breaks of gauge — or they could, if they did not have to transfer from one high-speed line to the next over "classical" lines using a different voltage and/or frequency.

=== Train protection ===
Multiple incompatible train protection systems are another barrier to interoperability. A unified system, ETCS, is the EU's project to unify train protection across Europe. The specification was written in 1996 in response to EU Directive 96/48/EC. ETCS is being developed as part of the European Rail Traffic Management System (ERTMS) initiative, and is being tested by multiple railway companies since 1999. All new high-speed lines and freight main lines funded partially by the EU are required to use ETCS Level 1 or Level 2. Also Switzerland, not being part of the EU, has implemented the ETCS.

=== Loading gauge ===
The loading gauge on the main lines of Great Britain, almost all of which were built before 1900, is generally smaller than in mainland Europe, where the slightly larger Berne gauge (Gabarit passe-partout international, PPI) was agreed to in 1913 as a general minimum standard (individual lines can and do adhere to larger loading gauge standards) and came into force in 1914. As a result, British (passenger) trains have noticeably and considerably smaller loading gauges and smaller interiors, despite the track being standard gauge.

This results in increased costs for purchasing trains as they must be specifically designed for the British network, rather than being purchased "off-the-shelf". For example, the new trains for HS2 have a 50% premium applied to the "classic compatible" sets which will be able to run on the rest of the network, meaning they will cost £40 million each rather than £27 million for the captive stock (built to European standards and unable to run on other lines), despite the captive stock being larger. Similarly prior to the construction of High Speed 1 (then also known as the "Channel Tunnel Rail Link") to continental European standards, the first generation Eurostar trains were required to have several custom modifications compared to the TGV trains they are based on, including narrower loading gauge and provision for third rail electrification as used in southeast England. The successor Eurostar e320 is an almost "off the shelf" Siemens Velaro and is thus incompatible with most of the British legacy rail network but can run on most of Europe's high speed rail network.

=== Railway platform height ===
Application of the EU standard platform heights for new construction: 550 mm (22 in) 760 mm (30 in) both 550 mm and 760 mm New builds in other heights than the EU standards

The European Union Commission issued a TSI (Technical Specifications for Interoperability) that sets out standard platform heights for passenger steps on high-speed rail. These standard heights are 550 and 760 mm (21.7 and 29.9 in). As the map indicates, there are several areas where 550 mm and 760 mm platform heights overlap and many trains serve stations with platforms of both heights posing challenges for step-free access. Where trains optimized for 760 mm platforms have to serve 550 mm platforms (or vice versa) accessibility is often limited. Due to path dependency a mixture of platform heights will continue to exist for the foreseeable future.

== Freight ==
=== Overview ===
There are specific railway corridors for freight operations across Europe. Overall, only about 18% of European cargo moves by railway. In comparison, in the United States, 38% of cargo (by ton-kilometer) moved via rail in 2000. The differences are primarily due to external factors such as geography.

The percentage of freight railway transportation varies between European countries. For example, in France the percentage is much lower than the European average, while it is much higher in other countries such as Lithuania, where over 70% of domestic cargo is transported by train. The relative weakness of rail freight is due to the lower price of truck transport which externalizes a larger share of costs than rail, as well as the high usage of coastal and inland shipping. Similarly Swiss railroads carry about 40% (by ton-kilometres) of domestic freight and even more than 70% of the (mostly international) freight traffic across the Swiss Alps: 74.4% in the first half of 2021. The Swiss new railway link through the Alps includes the Gotthard Base tunnel, one of the longest tunnels in the world, and was built specifically to shift freight traffic across the Alps from road to rail. As of 2024, two other base tunnels crossing the Alps are under construction: the Brenner Base Tunnel (between Austria and Italy) and the Mont d'Ambin Base Tunnel (between Italy and France). In addition, two tunnels in Austria (Koralm Tunnel, Semmering Base Tunnel) will shorten travel time in the near future.

=== Impediments to trans-European freight trains ===
A big problem for long-distance international freight services – despite the European Single Market allowing freedom of movement of goods, capital, labor and people and the Schengen area drastically reducing internal border controls – is the variety of differing standards for electrification, loading gauge, signaling, driver certificates and even gauge. Finland (Russian gauge), Portugal and Spain (Iberian gauge) use their own broad gauges, as do the Baltic States and several non-EU members (mostly Russian gauge). Rail Baltica is an EU-funded project to provide a standard gauge rail link in and through the Baltic countries, potentially connecting to a Helsinki-Tallinn tunnel. While attempts to unify the divergent standards date back to at least the 1880s with the Conférence internationale pour l'unité technique des chemins de fer (lit. 'international conference for the technical unity of railroads') in Bern, Switzerland, setting minimum standards for loading gauges (the so-called Berne gauge) and the so-called "Berne space" (the space reserved for railroad workers in buffer and chain couplers), most standards still differ widely between and even within countries as many rules only apply to newly-built infrastructure, as much of Europe's rail infrastructure was built in the 19th century, and upgrading it would be costly and disruptive.

=== Couplers and automation ===
Another problem is that unlike aviation, where Aviation English is a de facto global standard with few non-English holdouts, rail operations virtually always use the local language, requiring train operators either to be polyglots or necessitating a change of staff at every (language) border. Another impediment to freight rail in Europe is the coupling system commonly used. While the Scharfenberg coupler, a mostly automatic system, is now commonly used on passenger trains, its relatively low limit on the maximum tonnage it can pull makes it unsuitable for most freight operations. While American freight railroads largely use Janney couplers, European freight trains primarily still use buffer and chain couplers, which require railway workers to screw each connection open and shut again during shunting, reducing speed and efficiency and increasing labor cost, though unlike Janney couplers they allow for workers to adjust the slack between railcars. There are plans to replace these couplers with a new digital automatic coupling system, but those have taken longer than expected and are still far from completion. A pilot project regarding the digital automatic coupling system was launched by the German Federal Ministry of Transportation in 2020 and is to last until 2022.

=== Train lengths and double stacking ===
Train lengths in Europe are limited by the size of passing loops and refuge sidings as well as the placement of signals. There are plans to allow trains up to 740–750 m (2,430–2,460 ft) long to use the main freight lines by upgrading the requisite infrastructure; various construction projects to that end have already been completed. 750 meters is still much shorter than the longest trains worldwide; however most European rail infrastructure is not built to allow for longer trains without severe disruption. In addition, longer trains are considered to be more dangerous, as they provide more opportunities for freight cars to derail and make brake applications slower. Therefore, shorter freight trains may be an advantage rather than a disadvantage if safety is the priority.

Double stack rail transport, where two intermodal containers are stacked on top of another, either on flatcars or specifically designed well cars, is virtually unheard of in Europe as the loading gauge of most lines does not allow it. While the Betuweroute in the Netherlands was built with height clearances allowing double stacking, it does not (as of 2021) connect to any rail line that allows double stacking, and no double stack container trains have ever run along it.

=== Electrification ===
Unlike countries such as the United States, where mainline freight rail electrification is nonexistent, a relatively large percentage of European freight rails are electrified because freight trains usually use the same lines as passenger trains (nearly 57% of railway lines in the European Union are electrified). Since the percentage of electrified railway lines varies between countries, freight operations may sometimes also be performed using diesel locomotives. In Switzerland, nearly all railway lines are electrified except for some sidings to industrial areas. Therefore, freight trains are typically hauled by electric locomotives but shunting is sometimes done with diesel locomotives.

Because of differences in railway electrification between countries (or regions), electric locomotives need to be multi-system locomotives or otherwise a locomotive change is required at border stations.

== Passenger trains ==
=== Train categories ===
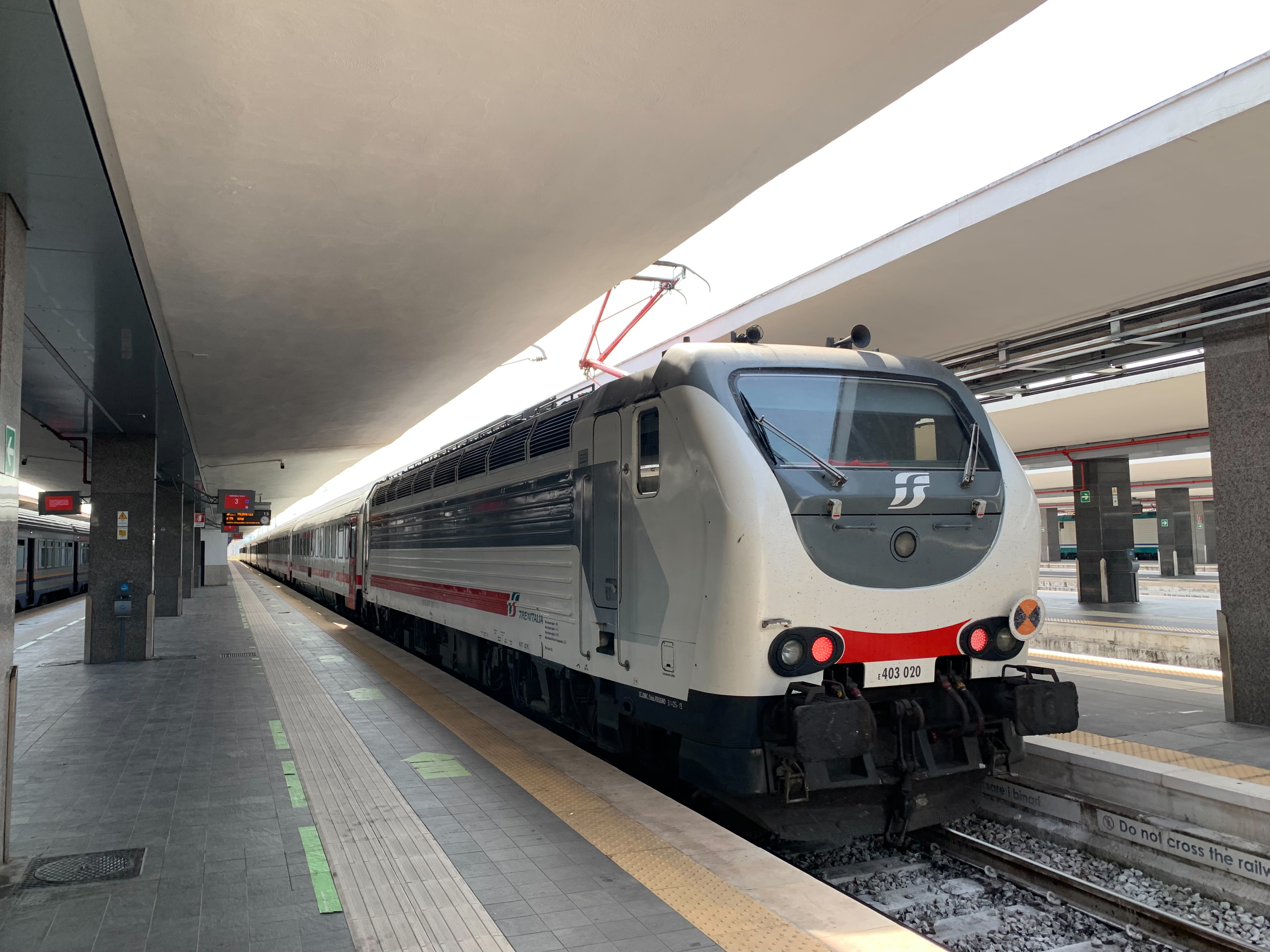
An E.403-hauled Italian InterCity train at Napoli Centrale

Passenger trains in Europe are assigned to different categories or train types by railway companies, depending on the used rolling stock, speed, distance of travel, stopping pattern and other criteria. Train categories or types often have specific abbreviations, such as EC (EuroCity) or IC (InterCity), which are frequently also shown on passenger information systems. Some lines are additionally numbered.

=== Metro systems ===
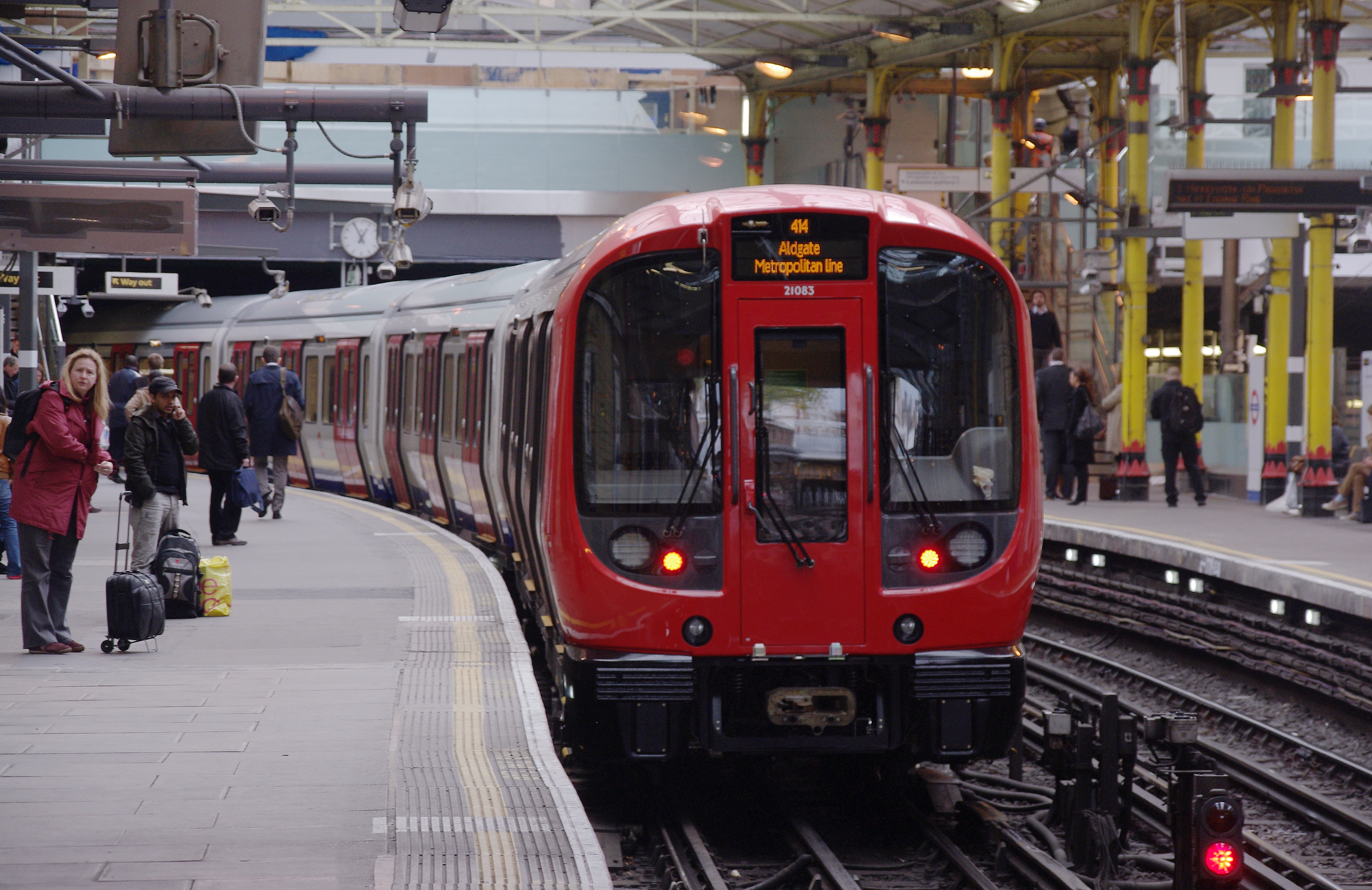
A sub-surface Metropolitan line train (S8 Stock) at Farringdon of the London Underground

Many cities across Europe have a rapid transit system, commonly referred to as a metro, which is an electric railway. The world's first underground railway, the Metropolitan Railway, was opened in London in 1863. It is now part of London's rapid transit system that referred to as the London Underground, the longest such system in Europe. After London, the largest European metro systems by track length are in Moscow, Madrid and Paris.

=== Commuter rail systems ===
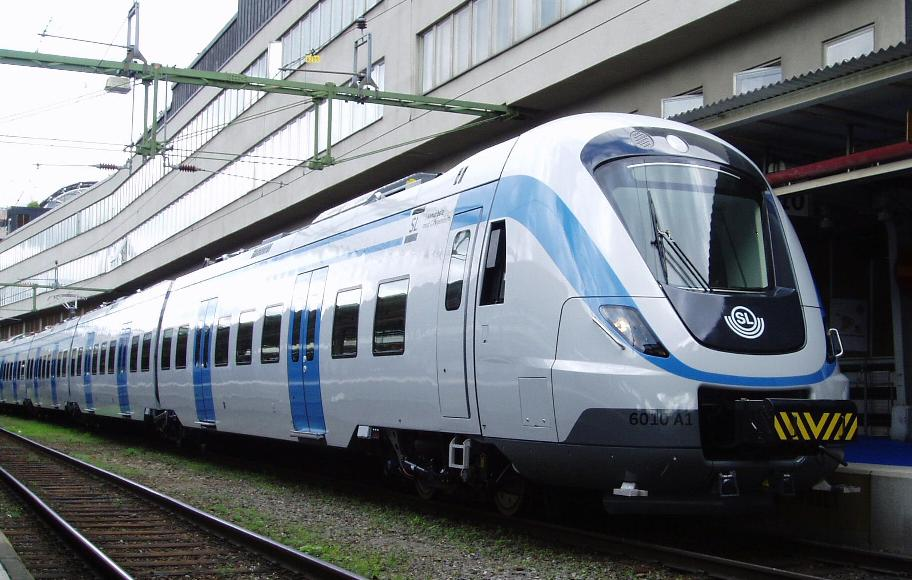
Type X60 at Stockholm Central Station in Sweden

Major metropolitan areas in most European countries are usually served by extensive commuter/suburban rail systems, including BG Voz in Belgrade (Serbia), the S-Bahn in Germany, Austria and German-speaking areas of Switzerland, Proastiakos in Greece, RER in France and Belgium, Servizio ferroviario suburbano in Italy, Cercanías and Rodalies (Catalonia) in Spain, CP Urban Services in Portugal, Esko in Prague and Ostrava (Czech Republic), HÉV in Budapest (Hungary), DART in Dublin (Ireland) and several more in the United Kingdom.

=== Cross-border operation ===
Passenger rail transport over many routes across European countries is facilitated through Interrail (for travelers from Europe) and Eurail (for non-European travelers) rail passes. Due to differences in railway electrification between certain countries, either multi-system electric multiple units (EMUs) or, in case of push-pull trains, multi-system locomotives are used for cross-border services.

==== Long-distance services ====
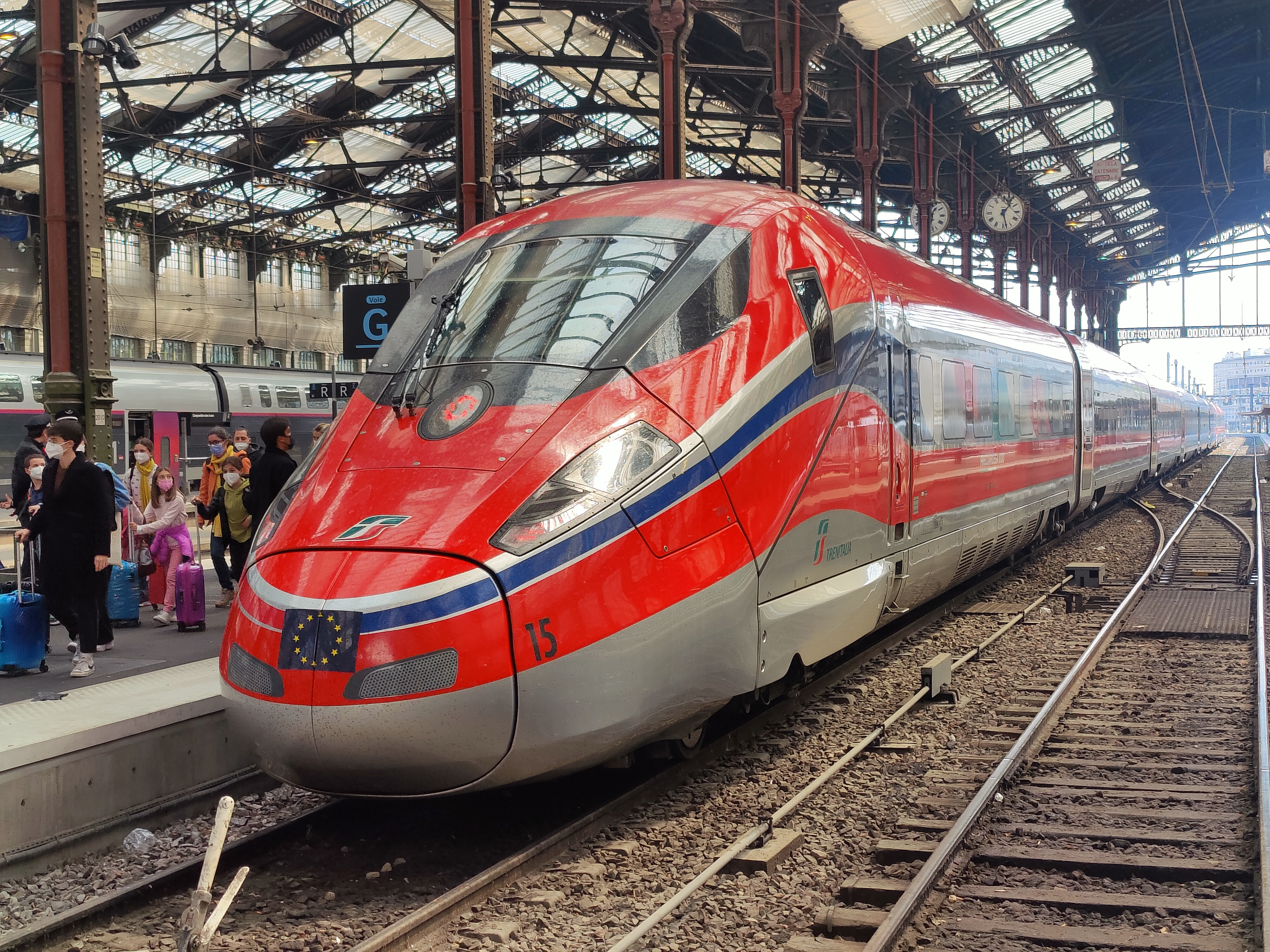
Trenitalia France's Frecciarossa 1000 high speed train service to Milano Centrale at Gare de Lyon station in Paris. With a maximum speed of 400 km/h (249 mph), it is one of the fastest trains in Europe.

The main international trains operating in Europe are:

- Belgrade-Bar Railway (Serbia, Montenegro)
- Enterprise (Republic of Ireland & Northern Ireland (UK))
- Eurostar (United Kingdom, France, Belgium, Netherlands, Germany), a high-speed train using the Channel Tunnel under the English Channel
- EuroCity / EuroNight (conventional trains run by nearly all Western and Central European operators, with the notable exception of the UK and Ireland)
- European Sleeper (Belgium, Netherlands, Germany, Czech Republic), a private operator planning services to France and Spain
- Frecciarossa (Italy, France), a high-speed train
- Intercity Direct (Netherlands, Belgium)
- Intercity Express (Germany, Netherlands, Belgium, France, Denmark, Switzerland, Austria), a high-speed train
- Nightjet (Austria, Switzerland, Italy, Germany, France, Belgium, Netherlands), a night train operated by Austrian Federal Railways (ÖBB)
- Railjet (Austria, Germany, Switzerland, Hungary, Czech Republic, Italy, Slovakia), a high-speed train
- Oresundtrain (Denmark, Sweden)
- Snälltåget (Sweden, Denmark, Germany)
- SuperCity Pendolino Košičan (Czech Republic, Slovakia)
- TGV (France, Belgium, Italy, Switzerland, Spain, Germany, Luxembourg), high-speed trains
- Venice Simplon-Orient-Express (VSOE), a luxury train between London and Venice
- Vy Class 73 (Sweden, Norway)
- SJ X 2000 (Sweden, Norway, Denmark)

===== Former long distance services =====
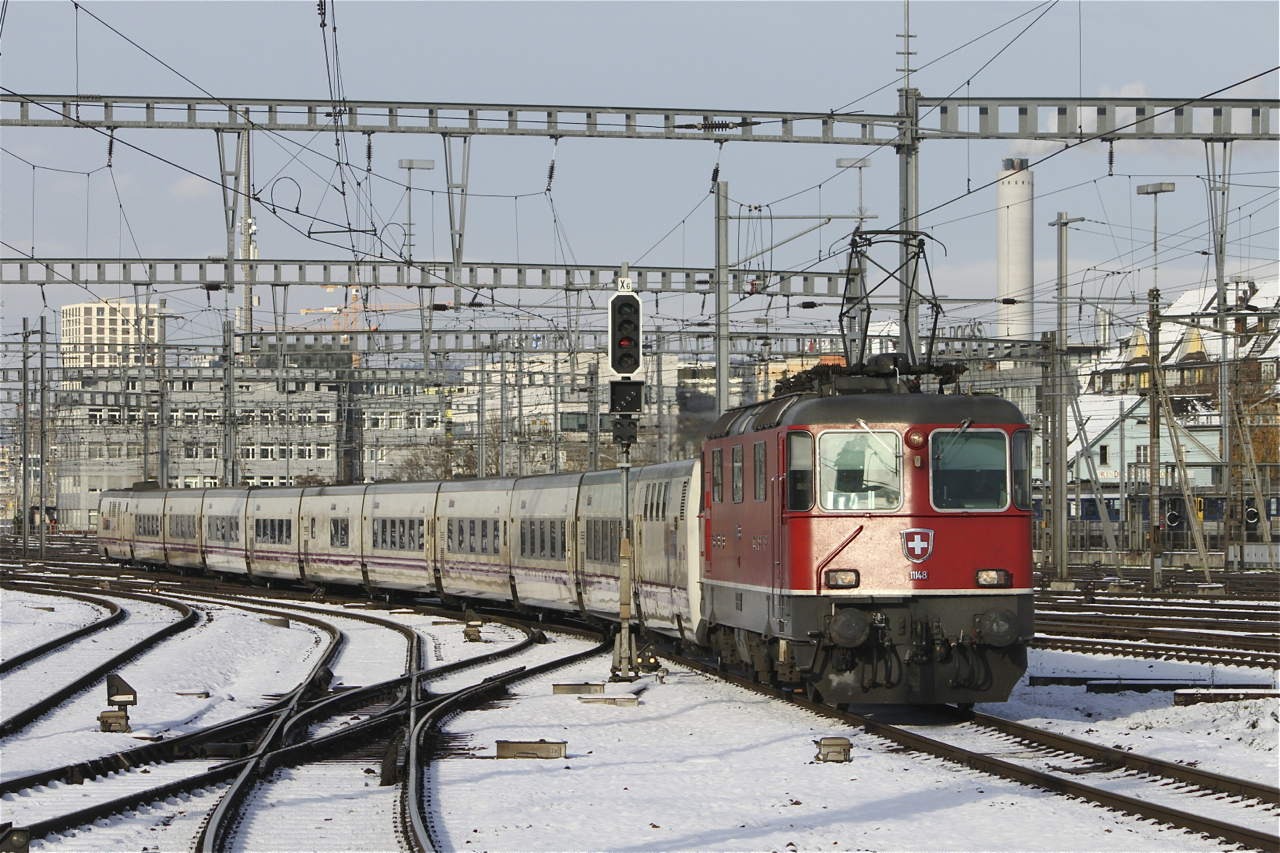
Former EN train Pau Casals from Barcelona Sants (Spain) arriving at Zürich HB (Switzerland). Locomotives (here Re 420) were switched at the borders.

There are a number of cross-border services that are no longer in operation:

- Allegro (Finland, Russia) service suspended since 27 March 2022 due to sanctions following the Russian invasion of Ukraine
- Cisalpin (France, Switzerland, Italy), using the Simplon Railway line to cross the Alps
- Cisalpino (Italy, Switzerland), using the Gotthard Railway line to cross the Alps
- Elipsos (France, Italy, Spain, Switzerland) France-Spain services discontinued since 2013, one service (Pau Casals) to Switzerland and one (Salvador Dalí) to Italy both ended in 2012, Elipsos operator is now defunct
- Orient Express (between London and Istanbul using different routes across mainland Europe)
- Thalys (Belgium, France, Germany, the Netherlands), a high-speed train service, now operating as Eurostar
- Trans Europ Express (several services across Western and Central Europe)
- Trenhotel (France, Spain, Portugal) All trenhotel services discontinued, including Hendaye–Madrid Atocha–Santa Apolónia (Lisbon) and Barcelona–Galicia services since 2020, the onset of the COVID-19 pandemic

===== Planned long distance services =====
- Accor plans to reopen the Orient Express between Paris and Istanbul as a luxury train in 2025
- Midnight Trains, a private operator, planned to open up new routes of sleeper trains across Europe such as Paris to Rome, Porto, Madrid/Barcelona, Venice, Edinburgh, among other destinations. It was discontinued in 2024

==== Regional and commuter trains ====
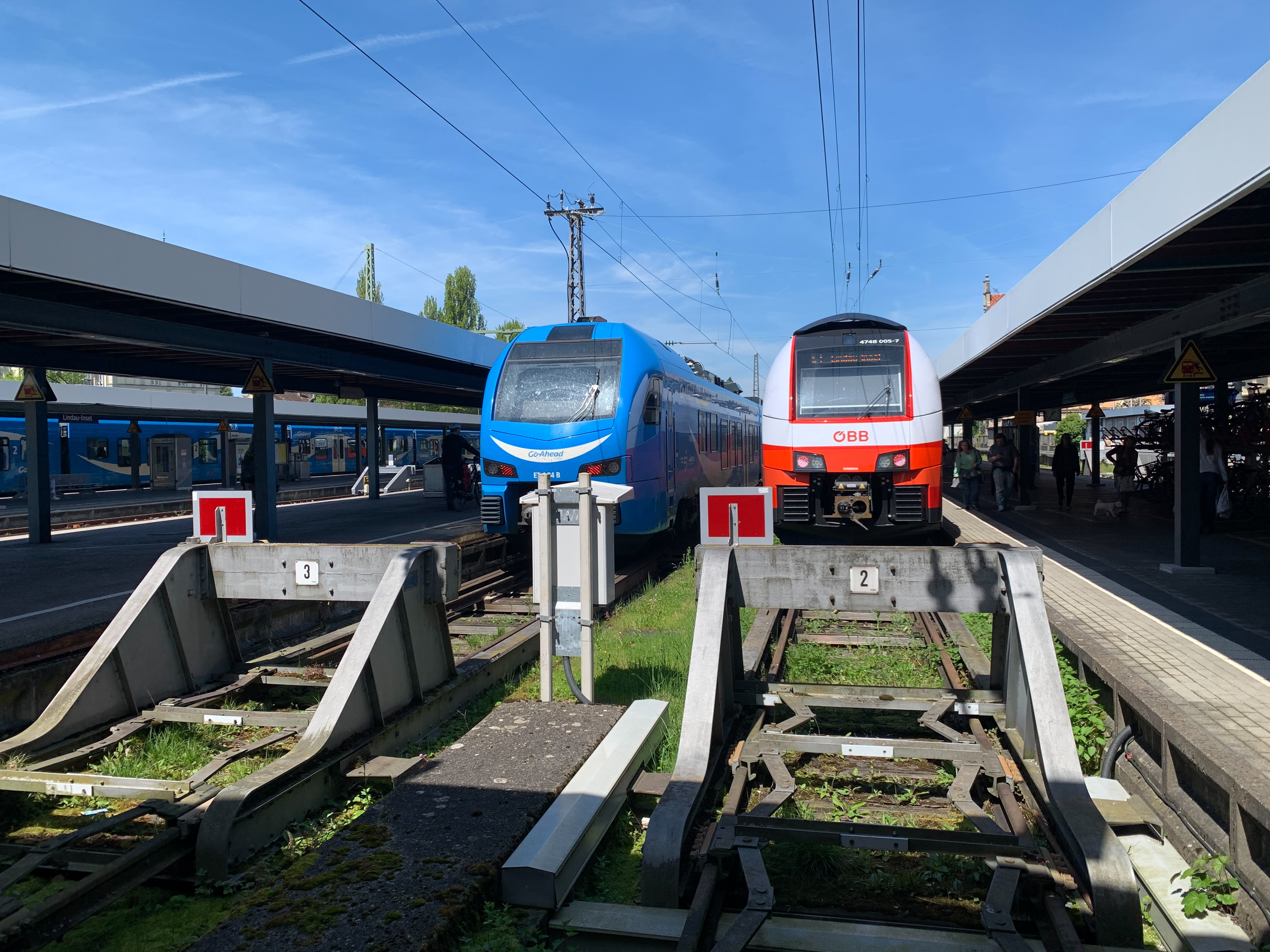
A cross-border service train of Vorarlberg S-Bahn and a train of Arverio (formerly GoAhead) meet at Lindau-Insel

In addition to long-distance services, there are also many cross-border trains at the local/regional level. The city of Basel in Switzerland, for example, is at the center of a trinational commuter rail network (known as S-Bahn in German-speaking regions) connecting stations in Switzerland, France and Germany. Another trinational commuter rail network exists around Lake Constance (Bodensee), the Bodensee S-Bahn, which links stations in Austria, Germany and Switzerland. Also the Swiss city of Geneva has a commuter rail network across the border with France. TILO also operates cross-border commuter trains between Switzerland and Italy. Trains crossing the border to Switzerland require narrower pantographs.

Also the Austrian Tyrol S-Bahn, Salzburg S-Bahn and Vorarlberg S-Bahn commuter rail networks have services that extend into neighbouring countries (Italy, Germany, Liechtenstein, Switzerland).

Some local lines, like the Gronau to Enschede line between Germany and the Netherlands, operate on the signaling system of the country the line originates from, with no connection to the other country's network, whilst other train services like the Saarbahn between Germany and France use specially equipped vehicles that have a certificate to run on both networks. When there is an electrification difference between two countries, border stations with switchable overhead lines can be used. Venlo railway station in the Netherlands is one such example, the overhead on the tracks can be switched between the Dutch 1500 V DC and the German 15 kV AC, which means a change of traction (or reconfiguring a multiple-voltage vehicle) is necessary at the station. On the other hand, an increasing number of locomotives can change voltages "on the fly" without stopping, usually with temporarily lowered pantographs, for instance on the viaduct of Moresnet where freight trains change voltages between Belgian 3 kV DC and German 15 kV 16.7 Hz. A third possibility concerns networks using voltages of the same order of magnitude, such as Belgium (3 kV DC) and the Netherlands (1.5 kV DC): Belgian trains to Maastricht or Roosendaal (Dutch stations located near the border) can use the lower Dutch voltage, albeit with reduced power, on the short stretch from the border to their Dutch terminal station and back. Increasingly the European Union mandates unified standards (see below) for newly built high speed lines to allow smoother international passenger services.

=== Luxury trains ===
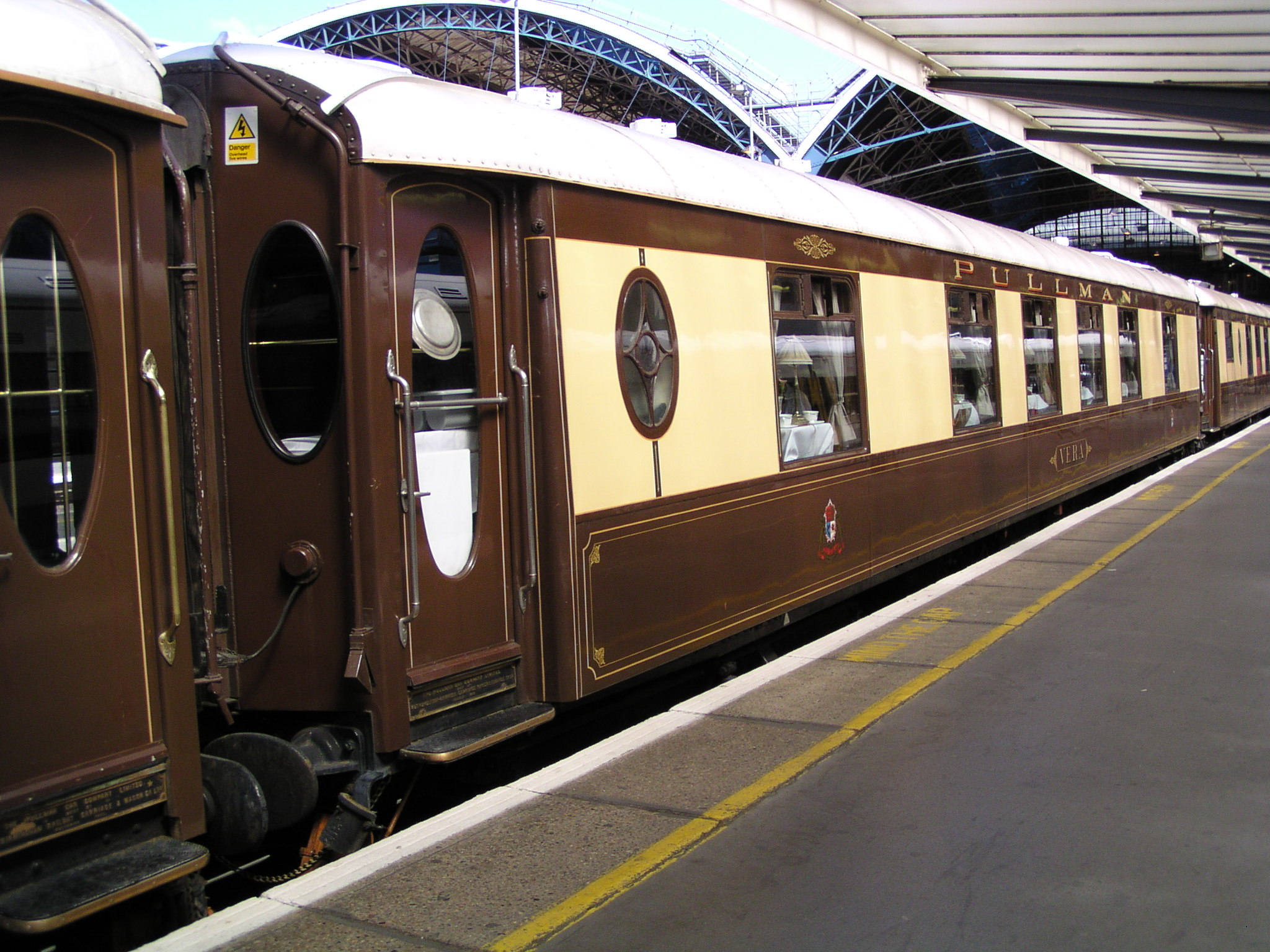
Former Brighton Belle Pullman carriage at London Victoria, now part of the Venice-Simplon Orient Express fleet

As of 2025, cross-border luxury trains in Europe include the Venice Simplon-Orient-Express, which runs between London and Venice, as well as national luxury train services in the United Kingdom (Northern Belle), Spain (Transcantábrico), Switzerland (GoldenPass Express) and Russia (Golden Eagle Trans-Siberian Express, which follows the Trans-Siberian Railway).

== High-speed railways ==
Operational high-speed lines in Europe

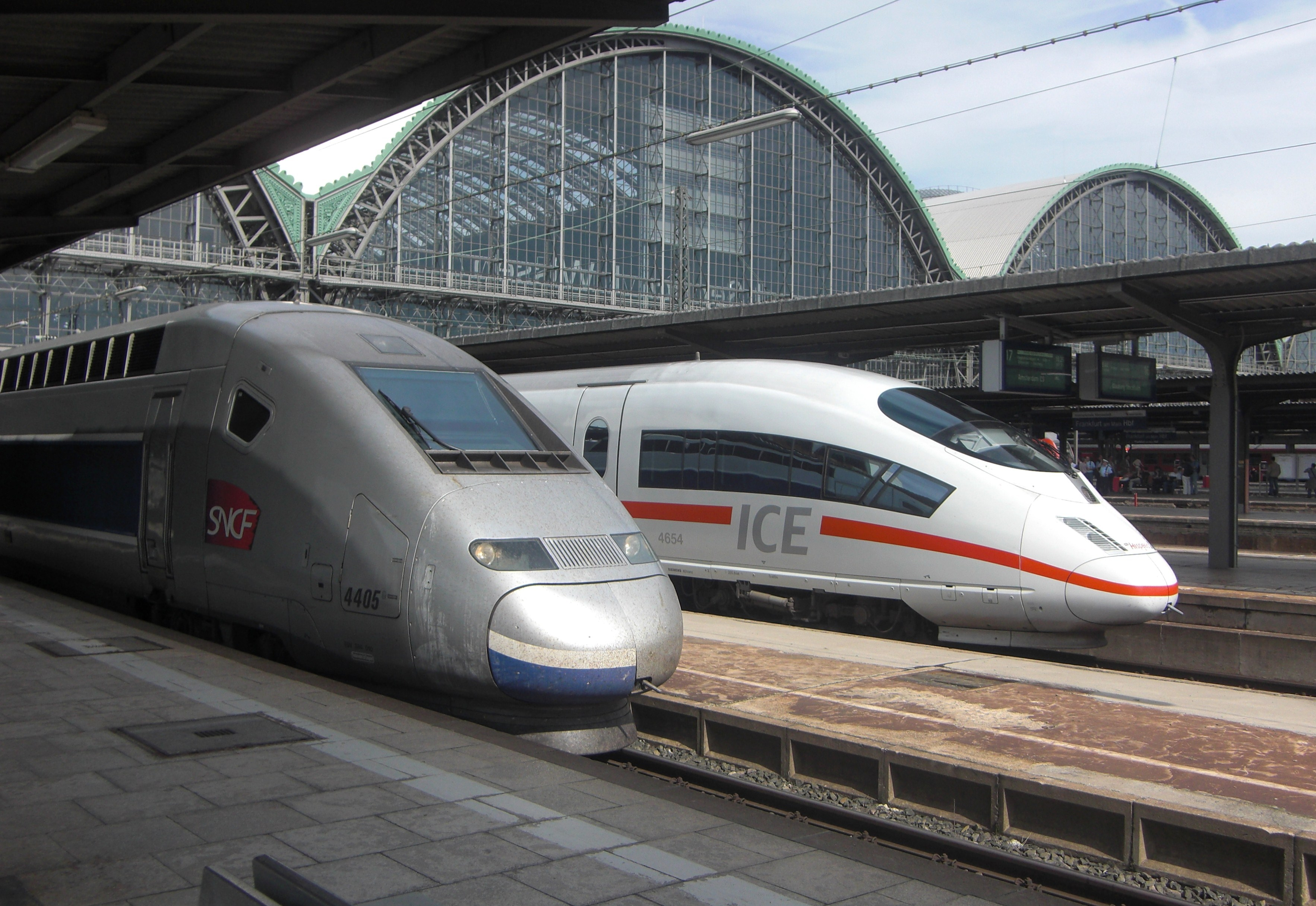
Two high-speed trains, SNCF's Train à grande vitesse (TGV) and DB's Intercity Express (ICE) at Frankfurt (Main) station

High-speed rail (HSR) is an increasingly popular and efficient means of transport. In Europe, the first HSR lines on the continent were built in the 1970s and since then an extensive HSR network developed, including several cross-border links. New international HSR tracks are still being built and upgraded to international standards as part of the EU's Trans-European high-speed rail network (TEN-R). As of 2024, Spain operates the largest HSR network in Europe (3,966 km or 2,464 mi) and the second-largest in the world after China.

The following countries have high-speed rail:

- Austria
- Belgium
- Czech Republic
- Denmark
- Finland
- France
- Germany
- Italy
- Norway
- Poland
- Portugal
- Russia
- Spain
- Sweden
- Switzerland
- The Netherlands
- Turkey
- United Kingdom

== Train ferries ==
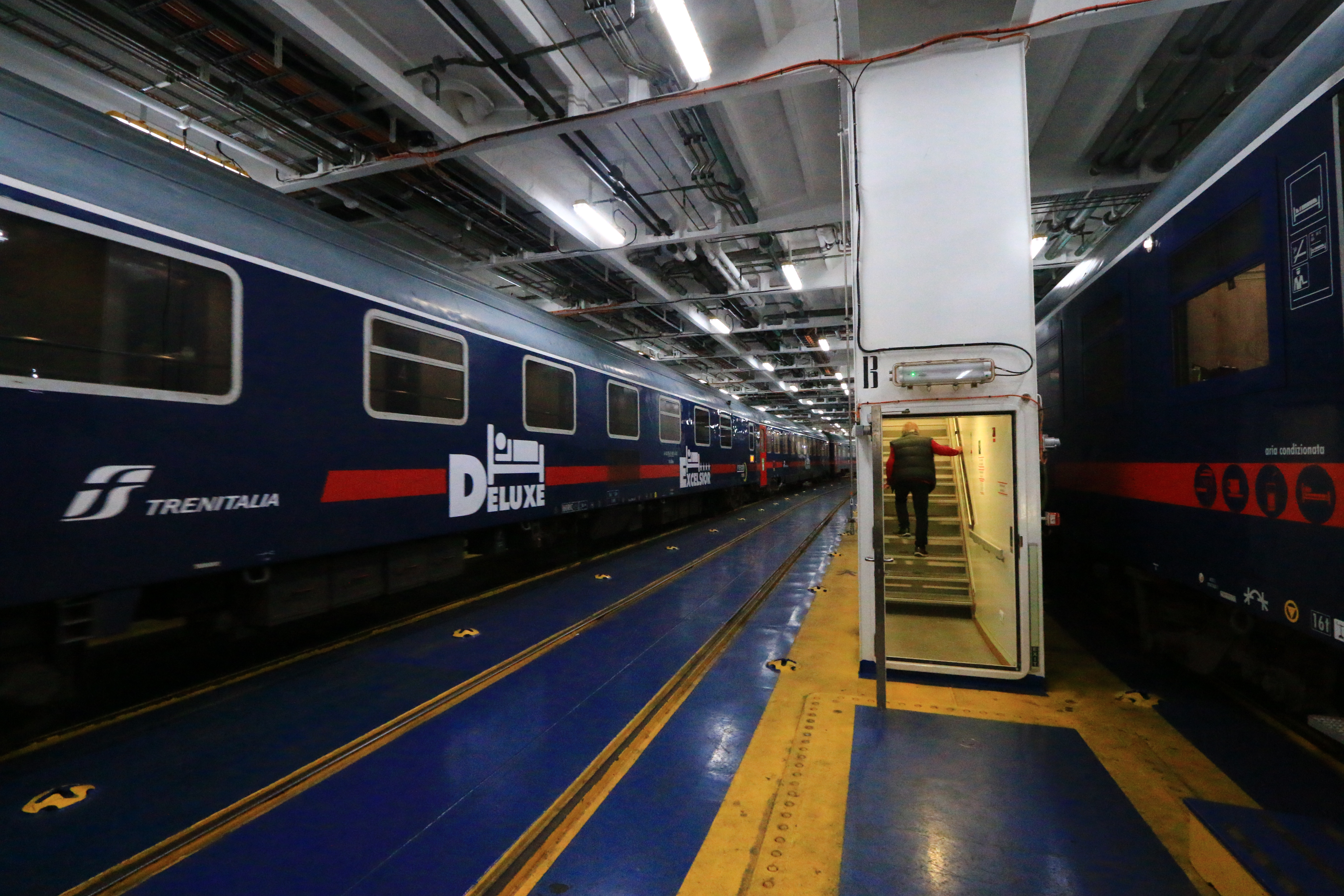
Train ferry across the Strait of Messina

Train ferries allow for shorter routes across a large body of water. In some cases, they became obsolete once railway bridges over straits were built, or for other reasons. They are still mostly used for rail freight transport, but also for passenger trains. In western Europe, there is a train ferry across the Baltic Sea between Trelleborg (Sweden) and Rostock (Germany). A second one exists between Puttgarden on the German island of Fehmarn and Rødby on the island of Lolland, Denmark, known as the Vogelfluglinie (lit. 'bird flight route'). This route was closed for passenger trains (ICE, EC) in December 2019.

In Italy, there are train ferries between the mainland and the islands of Sicily and Sardinia.

Between 1869 and 1976 (with suspensions during the First and Second World Wars), goods wagons were transported by train ferries across Lake Constance (German: Bodensee), a large lake between Austria, Germany and Switzerland. The Lake Constance train ferries became less economically feasible after the completion of the so-called belt railway around the lake, but was kept in operation for several decades as the railway lines could not accommodate additional traffic.

There are also train ferries across the Black Sea, partly linking Europe with Asia. For example between Varna (Bulgaria) and Odessa (Ukraine) or Batumi (Georgia), between Chornomorsk (Ukraine) and Derince (Turkey) and between Samsun (Turkey) and Kavkaz (Russia).

== Subsidies ==
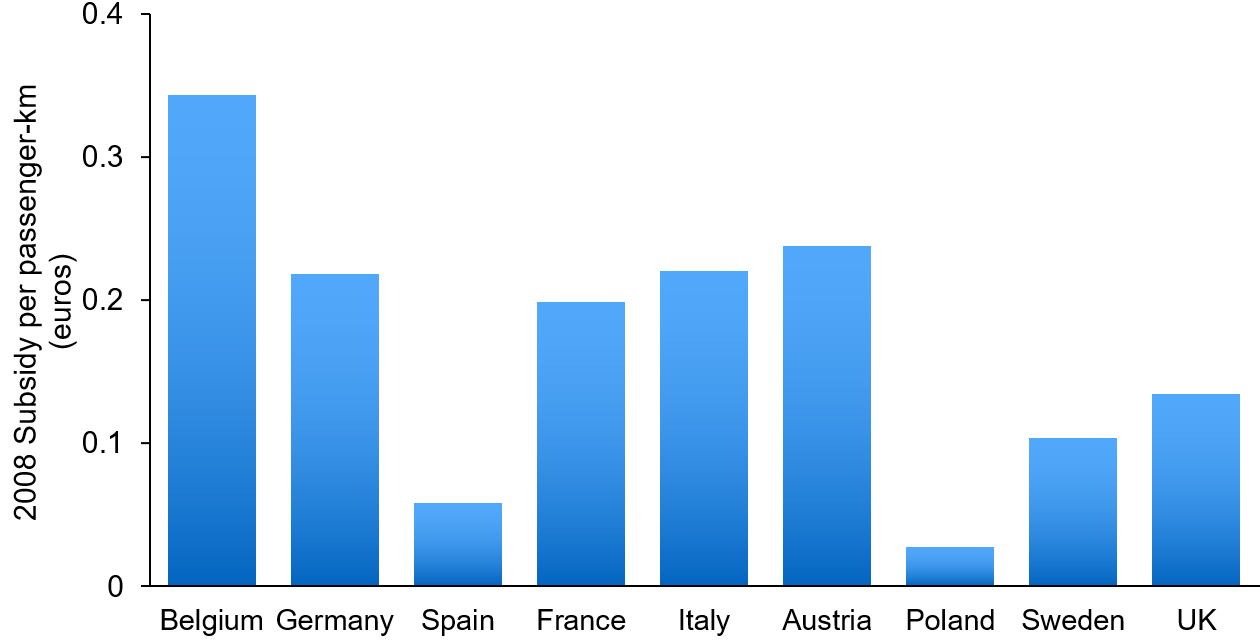
European rail subsidies in euros per passenger-km for 2008

EU rail subsidies amounted to €73 billion in 2005. Subsidies vary widely from country to country in both size and how they are distributed, with some countries giving direct grants to the infrastructure provider and some giving subsidies to train operating companies, often through public service obligations. Often long-distance trains are not subsidized.

The 2017 European Railway Performance Index found a positive correlation between public cost and a given railway system's performance and differences in the value that countries receive in return for their public cost. The 2015 and 2017 performance reports found a strong relationship between cost efficiency and the share of subsidies allocated to infrastructure managers. A transparent subsidy structure, in which public subsidies are provided directly to the infrastructure manager rather than spread among multiple train-operating companies, correlates with a higher-performing railway system.

The 2017 Index found Denmark, Finland, France, Germany, the Netherlands, Sweden, and Switzerland capture relatively high value for their money, while Luxembourg, Belgium, Latvia, Slovakia, Portugal, Romania, and Bulgaria underperform relative to the average ratio of performance to cost among European countries.

=== Total railway subsidies by country ===
Country	Subsidy (€ billions)	Year
Germany	17.0	2014
France	13.2	2013
Italy	7.6	2012
Spain	5.1	2015
United Kingdom	9.2	2016
Switzerland	4.3	2012
Belgium	2.8	2012
Netherlands	2.5	2014
Austria	2.3	2009
Denmark	1.7	2008
Sweden	1.6	2009
Poland	1.4	2008
Ireland	0.91	2008

=== Liberalization ===
Liberalization of European passenger rail market in 2012: None Quasi Partial Large Full No data

Fourth Railway Package attempts liberalization of domestic passenger services in an attempt to reduce European rail subsidies.

== Harmonizing rules ==
- First Railway Package (EU Directive 91/440)
- Second Railway Package
- Third railway package
- Fourth railway package
- European Rail Traffic Management System on harmonized signaling systems, to allow more cross-border trains
- Trans-European conventional rail network
- Single European Railway Area

As mentioned above, historically rules and standards on European railroads varied widely and thus the European Union has tried to harmonize and standardize those towards a single common European set of rules. The advent of High Speed Rail added to the "classical" problems of railway electrification standards, gauge, loading gauge and "classical" signaling the additional problem of train protection systems, which are necessary for any train exceeding the speed limit of legacy signaling (79 mph in the United States, 160 km/h (99 mph) in much of continental Europe and 125 mph in Great Britain). Virtually every European country with significant high speed rail ambitions developed its own, incompatible, standard, be it German LZB, French TVM or Italian BACC. As there was resistance to choosing any of the pre-existing systems as a basis for a new European standard the European Train Control System or ETCS was developed and is now mandatory for newly built high speed lines receiving EU funding.

== See also ==
- Deutschlandticket – Public transport ticket in Germany
- List of busiest railway stations in Europe
- List of European railways
- List of funiculars in Europe
- List of highest railways in Europe
- List of named passenger trains of Europe
- Narrow-gauge railways in Europe
- The Man in Seat Sixty-One – British travel website
- Trams in Europe
- Transport in Europe
- Transport in the European Union
