= Rail transport in Bulgaria =

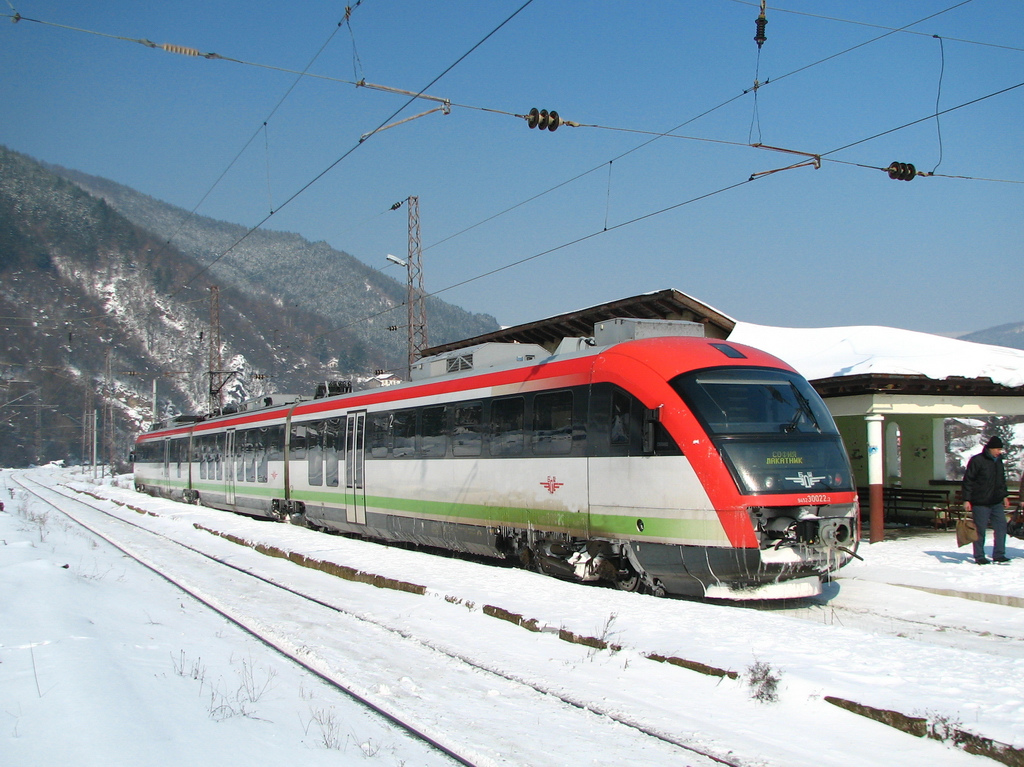
- A Siemens Desiro near Thompson

Operation
- National railway: Bulgarian State Railways
- Infrastructure company: National Railway Infrastructure Company

System length
- Total: 4,070 km (2,529.0 mi) (as of 31 Dec 2012)

Track gauge
- Main: 1,435 mm (4 ft 8 1/2 in)

Electrification
- Main: 25 kV AC, 50 Hz OHLE

Features
Map
- Map of the Bulgarian railway network

Rail transport in Bulgaria includes passenger and freight operations over its 4,070 km (2,530 mi) network of mostly 1,435 mm (4 ft 8 1/2 in) standard gauge railways. It is an important mode of transport in Bulgaria. Its infrastructure is owned by the National Railway Infrastructure Company (NRIC), and services are operated, among others, by the Bulgarian State Railways (BDŽ).

== History ==
The Ruse – Pliska - Varna, the first Bulgarian railway line, was started in 1864. The Ottoman government had commissioned for it an English company managed by William Gladstone, a politician, and the Barkley brothers, civil engineers. The 223 km (139 mi) long line was opened in 1866.

In 1870 Baron Maurice de Hirsch started the construction of the Constantinople – Luleburgaz - Edirne - Svilengrad - Plovdiv - Pazardzhik - Belovo railway line, completed three years later.

In 1885, the National Assembly passed the Railway Act, according to which railways in Bulgaria were considered state property and were to be operated by the state. In 1888 Stefan Stambolov's government expropriated the Vakarel – Belovo railway line (built and previously operated by Vitalis) and started operating it. On 1 August, the whole of the Tsaribrod (Dimitrovgrad, Serbia) – Sofia – Belovo railway line was opened for international traffic. The state bought off the Ruse – Varna railway line and started operating it on 10 August. The Bulgarian State Railways were therefore established, based on the Tsaribrod – Sofia – Belovo and Ruse – Varna railway lines. An independent Ministry of Railways, Post Offices and Telegraphs was established in 1912, followed by the State Railway School in 1923.

The next major railway line to be opened was the sub-Balkan railway line, in 1952.

Diesel traction was introduced in 1963 for train traffic with the diesel-hydraulic B′B′ locomotives (class 04), built by SGP. The first electrified line, Sofia – Plovdiv, entered into operation in the same year with the new then class 41, built by Škoda. The first doubled track line, the Sindel – Varna, was completed one year later.

In 1978 operations started on the Varna - Illichivsk ferry line with four train ferries capable of carrying each 104 four-axle 1,520 mm (4 ft 11 27/32 in) wagons. Break of gauge facility was constructed in Beloslav

In 2009 Bulgarian BDZ railway were close to bankruptcy after being insolvent for a number of years. The railway was rescued by creating a 2011 investment plan that attracted EU funds from the Connecting Europe Facility.

Investments of €3.3b in railway infrastructure, with EU help, will be undertaken between 2021 and 2027. In 2023 Bulgaria announced it would buy €1.4b of rolling stock with EU provided funds.

Begun in 2019, by 2023 a rail connection with Istanbul was established allowing trains to run at a speed of 200 km/h. The double line has a capacity for 10 million passengers and 3.6 million tonnes of freight. In 2022 work began on a Bulgaria-North Macedonia rail line as part of the Pan-European Corridor VIII.

== Narrow-gauge 760 mm (2 ft 5 15/16 in) railways ==
The scenic Septemvri-Dobrinishte narrow gauge line was finished in 1945. It goes through the station of Avramovo, which is the highest railway station on the Balkans at 1,267.4 m (4,158 ft). Further on, it passes through the summer and winter tourist centre of Bansko. The line is 760 mm (2 ft 5 15/16 in) Bosnian gauge, unelectrified, and is served primarily by diesel locomotives; however, there are well preserved steam locomotives that provide attraction tours. Even though it is very attractive to tourists, it is also widely used by the local inhabitants for public transport purposes.

== Rail links to adjacent countries ==
- Greece — Kulata - Promachonas and Svilengrad - Orestiada (Note: passenger services suspended from early 2011, resumed May 2014)
- North Macedonia — via Niš in Serbia or via Thessaloniki in Greece (Note: passenger services suspended from early 2011, resumed May 2014)
- Romania — via Ruse - Giurgiu bridge over the Danube, Kardam - Negru Voda and Vidin - Calafat bridge over the Danube.
- Serbia — via Kalotina - Dimitrovgrad, Serbia
- Turkey — via Svilengrad - Kapikule

== See also ==
- Bulgarian State Railways
- Transport in Bulgaria
