= European Union Agency for Railways =

Agency of the European Union

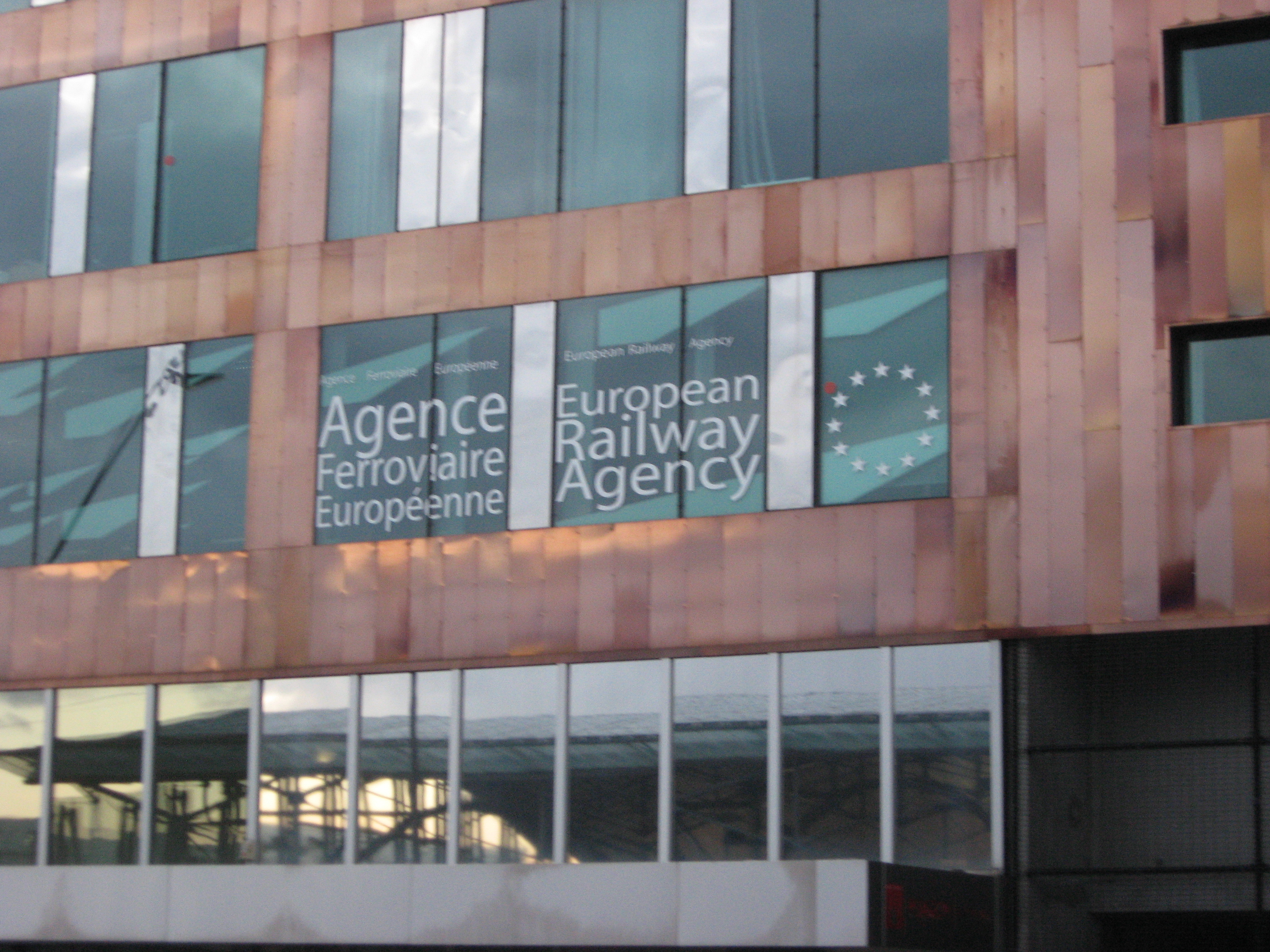
- ERA, Lille

- European Union Agency for Railways (European Union)
- Formation: April 2004 (established)
- Location(s): Valenciennes & Lille, France
- Director: Oana Gherghinescu
- Website: era.europa.eu
- Formerly called: European Railway Agency (ERA, acronym still used)

The European Union Agency for Railways (ERA) is an agency of the European Union (EU) that sets mandatory requirements for European railways and manufacturers in the form of Technical Specifications for Interoperability (TSI), which apply to the Trans-European Rail system. It is located in Valenciennes and Lille (Nord, Hauts-de-France, France).The ERA publishes a document summarising the status of the TSIs. The ERA sets common safety targets, common safety methods (CSM) following the directive 2015/1136/EC and common safety indicators, following Directive 2004/49/EC and amendments. The ERA also hosts a number of databases, among which a register of remaining, applicable national rules. One of its primary duties is the development and implementation of the European Rail Traffic Management System (ERTMS).

== History ==
Prior to the establishment of the agency, the railway networks of each individual member state within the European Union had been unique and typically employing high levels of bespoke, self-developed working practices, rolling stock, and infrastructure; the requirements pertaining to safety, operations, signalling, and most elements were defined by each member state, resulting in substantial differences in various systems and thereby hundreds of factors for incompatibilities that deterred or outright prevented cross-border operations. Limitations to loading gauges, differing signaling apparatus, incompatible power systems, and often arbitrary standards cumulatively acted against the competitiveness of European railway operations, particularly in comparison to the relatively lower barriers present in the competing road transport sector. European officials came to recognise the need for pan-national action to address the lack of railway interoperability; this resolve would solidify in the adoption of the Directive 96/48/EC (Trans-European high-speed rail network), which pertains to the interoperability of the trans-European high-speed rail network.

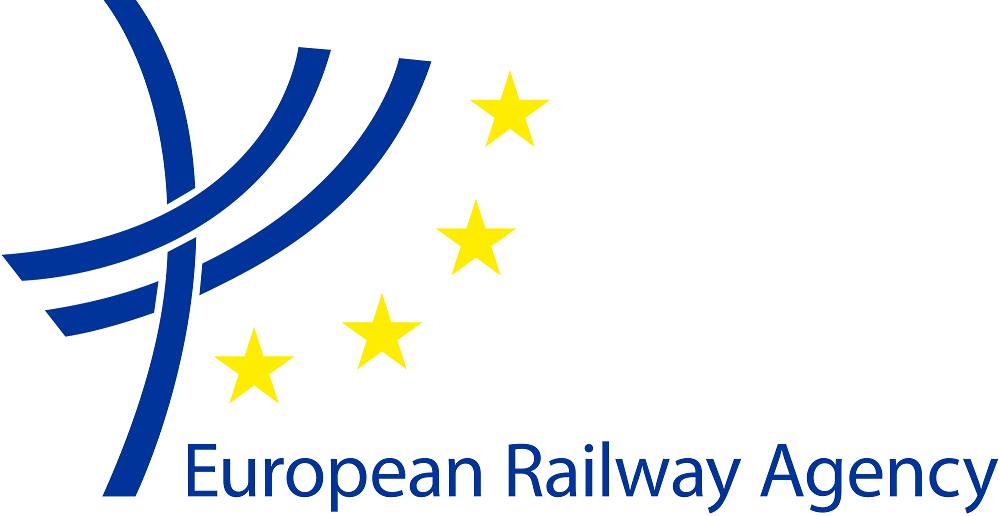
Old logo of the European Railway Agency

In successive years, additional legislation towards bolstering international cooperation and the lowering of national barriers were also implemented, such as in the Interoperability Directive of 2001 that covered the trans-European conventional rail. During 2004, legislation for the creation of a new pan-European agency was passed as a part of the Second Railway Package; one year later, this organisation commenced operations as the European Railway Agency (ERA) with the principal objective of contributing to the implementation of EU legislation aimed at improving railway competitiveness by advancing interoperability of railway systems and pursuing a common approach to safety in the railway sector. The ERA was not empowered to directly modify European legislation; it instead prepared, in cooperation with industry stakeholders and the various National Safety Authorities, new and updated legislative acts and recommended their adoption to the European Commission.

One of the ERA's most prominent long-term undertakings has been the European Railway Traffic Management System (ERTMS). The specifications, comprising the European Train Control System (ETCS) and the GSM-R digital radio communication system, are enforced as European legislation, part of the Technical Specifications for Interoperability (TSI) for Control Command and Signalling, published in the Official Journal of the EU. By December 2010, deployment of GSM-R had taken place across more than 65,000km of track in Europe. Operations of the system had commenced in five countries: Germany, Italy, the Netherlands, Norway and Sweden. By that time, the operations of ETCS had already begun as well on high-speed railways in both Spain and Italy, as well as on freight lines in the Netherlands and for international operations between Belgium and the Netherlands. Contracts for the provision of over 10,000km of track had been signed. Under the Fourth Railway Package, the ERA was formally recognised as the ERTMS authority; as such, the agency has been leading specification development and implementation.

The ERA has also pursued multiple other areas of improvement, such as automatic train operations and eco-friendly railway practices. New TSIs pertaining to noise reduction in the railway sector have also been formulated; thus, rolling stock has been required to meet certain noise emission limitations to avoid excessively impacting the general public, while a "quieter route" scheme has also been proposed. The ERA has also promoted more efficient rail freight operations, via improved logistics practices, such as optimised route planning and load consolidation, some of which having been facilitated via digital railway technologies.

In June 2016, the agency's name was changed as a result of the European Parliament's approval of the Fourth Railway Package, becoming the European Union Agency for Railways. The acronym ERA has continued to be used to refer to the agency after the renaming, including by the agency itself. The ERA's first deliverable under the framework of the Technical Pillar of the Fourth Railway Package would be a Safety Alert IT tool, which was designed to increase transparency in rail safety incident reporting in the EU, and to share information among rail operators and manufacturers.

During early 2019, the ERA established its One-Stop Shop which handles all applications for single safety certificates, vehicle authorisations and ERTMS trackside approvals. In September of that year, the agency issued its first single safety certificate; at the time, multiple other applications were stated to be underway while the process was still being rolled out into early 2020. The One-Stop Shop approach has been promoted as reducing the time and cost involved in gaining required approvals by an anticipated rate of 20 percent, which is expect to yield savings of up to €500 million by 2025.

In November 2021, the ERA and the International Union of Railways (UIC) both signed a coordination framework covering the topics of railway safety, interoperability, and harmonisation; both organisations seek to bolster international cooperation and operational compatibility. Three months later, Pio Guido, ERA's Head of Railway Systems Department, publicly stated that interoperability is not only a key focus of the agency but a necessary pursuit towards a more competitive railway industry.

== ERA and National Safety Authorities ==
The ERA coordinates the development and management of the European railway system in conjunction with 28 National Safety Authorities (NSAs). This includes the NSAs of 25 out of 27 member states of the European Union (Malta has not operated railways since 1931; Cyprus not since 1951/1974), plus Norway, the United Kingdom, and the Channel Tunnel Intergovernmental Commission (IGC, including the Channel Tunnel Safety Authority).

== See also ==
- Rail transport in Europe
- European Rail Infrastructure Managers
