= Trans-European Networks =

European Union infrastructure corridors and agreements

The Trans-European Networks (TEN) were created by the European Union by Articles 154–156 of the Treaty of Rome (1957), with the stated goals of the creation of an internal market and the reinforcement of economic and social cohesion. To various supporters of this policy, it made little sense to talk of a big EU market, with freedom of movement within it for goods, persons and services, unless the various regions and national networks making up that market were properly linked by modern and efficient infrastructure. The construction of Trans-European Networks was also seen as an important element for economic growth and the creation of employment.

The Treaty Establishing the European Community first provided a legal basis for the TENs. Under the terms of Chapter XV of the Treaty (Articles 154, 155 and 156), the European Union must aim to promote the development of Trans-European Networks as a key element for the creation of the Internal Market and the reinforcement of Economic and Social Cohesion. This development includes the interconnection and interoperability of national networks as well as access to such networks.

According with these objectives, the European Commission developed guidelines covering the objectives, priorities, identification of projects of common interest and broad lines of measures for the three sectors concerned (Transports, Energy and Telecommunications). The European Parliament and the Council approved these guidelines after consultation with the Economic and Social Committee and the Committee of the Regions.

Many projects of common interest have benefited from financial support of the European Union budget through the TEN-budget line as well as the Structural Funds and Cohesion Fund. The European Investment Bank has also greatly contributed to the financing of these projects through loans.

Three classes of network were defined by the treaty:

- Trans-European Transport Networks (TEN-T)
- Trans-European Energy Networks (TEN-E or TEN-Energy)
- Trans-European Telecommunications Networks (eTEN)

== See also ==
Trans-European Transport Network (TEN-T)

- Trans-European Transport Network Executive Agency (TEN-T EA)
- Trans-European Combined Transport network
- Trans-European Rail network
  - Trans-European conventional rail network
  - Trans-European high-speed rail network (TEN-R)
- Trans-European Inland Waterway network
- Trans-European road network (TERN)
- Trans-European Airport network
- Trans-European Seaport network
- Archives of Trans European Networks at the Historical Archives of the EU
