= Transport in the European Union =

Map of the planned Trans-European Transport Network (TEN-T)

The Schengen Area enables border control-free travel between 29 European countries (blue).

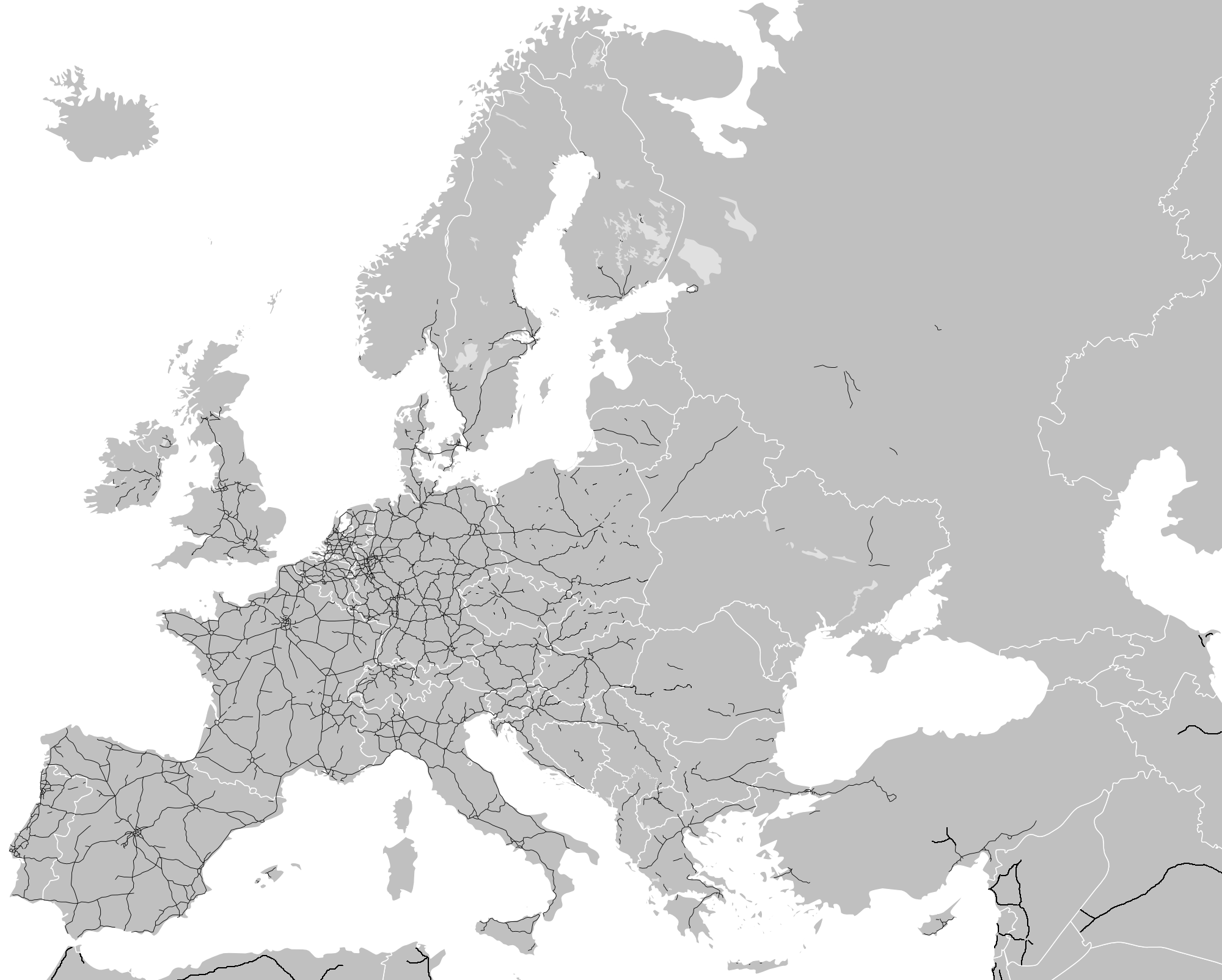
Approximate extent of completed motorway network in Europe as of Dec 2012

Transport in the European Union is a shared competence of the Union and its member states. The European Commission includes a Commissioner for Transport, currently Apostolos Tzitzikostas. Since 2012, the commission also includes a Directorate-General for Mobility and Transport which develops EU policies in the transport sector and manages funding for Trans-European Networks and technological development and innovation, worth €850 million yearly for the period 2000–2006.

During the financial framework 2014–2020 and EU budget 2014, there is 1485.2 euro million commitment for transport, end 761.4 for payment.

== Air transport ==
Since 1992, year of the inception of the internal market for aviation of the European Union, the number of passengers and routes has increased substantially: from 10,000 daily flights in 1992 to around 25,000 in 2017, and the number of routes from 2,700 to 8,400. In 2017 alone, over 1 billion passengers had flown from, to, or within the European Union. Between 2001 and 2019, European air supply effectively doubled.

Since Brexit in 2020, the four busiest airports in the European Union are consistently Paris - Charles de Gaulle, Amsterdam Schiphol, Frankfurt and Madrid-Barajas. These are major international hubs for civil aviation. Outside of the EU, three airports also constitute major European international hubs, namely London - Heathrow, Istanbul and Moscow - Sheremetyevo. Since the 2022 Invasion of Ukraine the Russian airports are not connected to any EU airport.

The doubling in air supply was accompanied by an increased market share of low-cost carriers within the EU, which went from 5.3% of total seats available in 2001 to 37.3% of the total share in 2019. Most of the increased demand was met in primary airports (i.e. Barcelona, Düsseldorf, Palma de Mallorca), whereas secondary airports which had capitalized on the early rise of low-cost carriers (Brussels-Charleroi, Rome Ciampino, Paris Beauvais) have for the most part fallen in rank.

To combat a fragmented airspace, air control inefficiencies and delays which were costing an estimated $4.2bn as early as 1989, the European Commission introduced plans for a Single European Sky (SES) initiative in 2001, with the purpose of co-ordinating the design, management and regulation of airspace in the Union. The first SES package was adopted in 2004, with subsequent revisions and extensions adopted in 2009 (SES II), 2014 (SES 2+), and 2019 (Amended SES 2+). Five major stakeholders are today involved: the commission is responsible for the implementation of SES; EASA fulfills oversight and support duties for member states, and supports the policymaking of the commission; Eurocontrol is in charge for air traffic flow management and technical support to the commission; and the Single Sky Committee (SSC), composed of representatives of the member states, issues opinions on the implementation work done by the commission. Finally, National Supervisory Authorities (NSAs) are competent with issuing certifications for national airline operators and are entitled to draft and monitor their own performance plans and targets.

The EU also participates in Eurocontrol, which coordinates and plans air traffic control for all of Europe. The European Aviation Safety Agency (EASA) has regulatory and executive tasks in the field of civilian aviation safety, such as issuing type certificates.

=== Connections with airports from non-EU countries ===
The European Union is one of the world's most densely interconnected air transport markets. Yet, in 2024-2025 on average 50% of the passengers traveling by air in the EU were on extra-EU flights.

As of February 2026, the EU has direct flights to 115 countries (excluding OCTs) across all continents.

The table below lists the non-EU countries that have direct flights to any of the 4 major EU hubs mentioned above (CDG, AMS, FRA, MAD) or other European major hubs (IST, LHR, SVO). If none of these 7 have a direct connection, it's specified whether any other airport of the 27 EU members has one.

Connections with non-EU countries, as of 5 of February 2026 (Note: If the country has a direct connection with any of the major 4 EU airports listed, it is not specified whether it has connections with others. That information is only given if there is not a direct link with CDG, AMS, FRA or MAD.) (Note: This list does not intend to be exhaustive, just to paint the picture of the EU global connectivity.)
Country / Dependency	Paris - Charles de Gaulle (CDG)	Amsterdam Schiphol (AMS)	Frankfurt (FRA)	Madrid - Barajas (MAD)	Other EU airport(s) (Note: Only if none of the 4 major hubs have regular flights)	Istanbul (IST)	London - Heathrow (LHR)	Moskow - Sheremetyevo (SVO)	Comments
Country / Dependency	EU major hubs with direct flights				Other EU airport(s)	Other major European (non-EU) hubs with direct flights			Comments
Russia	No	No	No	No		No	n/a	Since the 2022 Invasion of Ukraine no EU airport has direct flights to Russia.	
Canada	Yes	Yes	Yes	Yes		Yes	No		
China	Yes	Yes	Yes	Yes		Yes	Yes		
United States of America	Yes	Yes	Yes	Yes		Yes	No		
Brazil	Yes	Yes	Yes	Yes		Yes	No		
Australia	Yes	No	No	No		Yes	No		
India	Yes	Yes	Yes	No		Yes	Yes		
Argentina	Yes	Yes	Yes	Yes		No	No		
Kazakhstan	No	Yes	Yes	No		Yes	Yes		
Algeria	Yes	No	Yes	Yes		Yes	Yes		
Democratic Republic of the Congo	Yes	No	No	No		No	No		
Greenland (Denmark)	No	No	No	No	(European Union) Copenhagen Airport (CPH)	No	No	Greenland is part of the Kingdom of Denmark, but is not in the EU; it's part of the Overseas Countries and Territories.	
Saudi Arabia	Yes	Yes	Yes	Yes		Yes	Yes		
Mexico	Yes	Yes	Yes	Yes		Yes	No		
Indonesia	No	Yes	No	No		No	No		
Sudan	No	No	No	No		No	No	No EU airport has direct flights to Sudan	
Libya	No	No	No	No	(European Union) Rome-Fiumicino (FCO) (European Union) Malta (MLA) (European Union) Milan Malpensa (MXP)	No	No		
Iran	No	No	No	No		No	Yes	No EU airport has direct flights to Iran	
Mongolia	No	No	Yes	No		No	No		
Peru	Yes	Yes	No	Yes		No	No		
Chad	Yes	No	No	No		No	No		
Niger	No	No	No	No	(European Union) Oslo Airport (OSL)	No	No		
Angola	Yes	No	Yes	No		No	No		
Mali	No	No	No	No	(European Union) Paris-Orly (ORY)	No	No		
South Africa	Yes	Yes	Yes	No		Yes	No		
Colombia	Yes	Yes	Yes	Yes		Yes	No		
Ethiopia	Yes	No	Yes	Yes		Yes	No		
Bolivia	No	No	No	Yes		No	No		
Mauritania	Yes	No	No	No		No	No		
Egypt	Yes	Yes	Yes	Yes		Yes	Yes		
Tanzania	Yes	Yes	Yes	No		No	No		
Nigeria	Yes	Yes	Yes	No		Yes	No		
Venezuela	No	No	No	Yes		No	No		
Pakistan	Yes	No	No	No		No	No		
Namibia	No	No	Yes	No		No	No		
Mozambique	No	No	No	No	(European Union) Lisbon (LIS)	No	No		
Turkey	Yes	Yes	Yes	Yes		Yes	Yes		
Chile	Yes	No	No	Yes		Yes	No		
Zambia	No	No	No	No		No	No	No European airport has direct flights to Zambia. Global connecting hubs include Doha (DOH), Dubai (DXB), Addis Ababa (ABB) or Johannesburg (JNB), among others.	
Myanmar	No	No	No	No		No	No	No European airport has direct flights to Myanmar. Global connecting hubs include Dubai (DXB), Singapore (SIN) or Bangkok (BKK), among others.	
Afghanistan	No	No	No	No		No	Yes	No EU airport has direct flights to Afghanistan	
South Sudan	No	No	No	No		No	No	No EU airport has direct flights to South Sudan	
Somalia	No	No	No	No		No	No	No EU airport has direct flights to Somalia	
Central African Republic	No	No	No	No		No	No	No European airport has direct flights to the Central African Republic. Global and regional connecting hubs include Addis Ababa (ABB), Casablanca (CMN) or Douala (DLA) among others.	
Madagascar	Yes	No	No	No		No	No		
Botswana	No	No	No	No		No	No	No European airport has direct flights to Botswana. Global and regional connecting hubs include Addis Ababa (ABB), Johannesburg (JNB) or Cape Town (CPT) among others.	
Kenya	Yes	Yes	Yes	No		Yes	No		
Ukraine	No	No	No	No		No	No	Since the 2022 Russian invasion of Ukraine, the Ukrainian airspace is closed and all flight routes have been indefinitely canceled.	
Thailand	Yes	Yes	Yes	Yes		Yes	Yes		
Turkmenistan	No	No	Yes	No		No	No		
Cameroon	Yes	No	No	No		No	No		
Papua New Guinea	No	No	No	No		No	No	No European airport has direct flights to Papua New Guinea. Global connecting hubs include Singapore (SIN), Sydney (SYD) or Hong Kong (HKG), among others.	
Yemen	No	No	No	No		No	No	No European airport has direct flights to Yemen. Global connecting hubs include Jeddah (JED), Riyad (RUD), Cairo (CAI) or Addis Ababa (ABB), among others.	
Uzbekistan	Yes	No	Yes	No		Yes	Yes		
Morocco	Yes	Yes	Yes	Yes		Yes	Yes		
Iraq	No	Yes	No	No		No	No		
Paraguay	No	No	No	Yes		No	No		
Zimbabwe	No	No	No	No		No	No	No European airport has direct flights to Botswana. Global and regional connecting hubs include Addis Ababa (ABB), Johannesburg (JNB) or Cape Town (CPT) among others.	
Norway	Yes	Yes	Yes	Yes		Yes	No	Norway is not an EU member but it's part of the EEA and the Schengen Area. (Note: Mainland Norway is part of the Schengen Area and the EEA, but some of the Norwegian overseas territories are not. See Special territories of members of the European Economic Area.)	
Japan	Yes	Yes	Yes	Yes		Yes	No		
Republic of the Congo	Yes	No	No	No		No	No		
Vietnam	Yes	No	Yes	No		Yes	Yes		
Malaysia	Yes	Yes	No	No		Yes	No		
Ivory Coast	Yes	No	No	No		No	No		
Oman	Yes	Yes	Yes	No		Yes	Yes		
Philippines	Yes	No	No	No		No	No		
Ecuador	No	Yes	No	Yes		No	No		
Burkina Faso	No	No	No	No	(European Union) Brussels (BRU)	No	No		
New Zealand	No	No	No	No		No	No	No European airport has direct flights to New Zealand. Global and connecting hubs include Doha (DOH), Dubai (DXB) or Singapore (SIN), among others.	
Gabon	Yes	No	No	No		No	No		
Western Sahara	No	No	No	Yes		No	No		
Guinea	Yes	No	No	No		No	No		
United Kingdom	Yes	Yes	Yes	Yes		n/a	No		
Uganda	No	Yes	No	No		No	No		
Ghana	No	Yes	No	No		Yes	No		
Laos	No	No	No	No		No	No	No European airport has direct flights to Laos. Global connecting hubs include Hong Kong (HKG), Singapore (SIN) or Bangkok (BKK), among others.	
Guyana	No	Yes	No	No		No	No		
Belarus	No	No	No	No		No	Yes	No EU airport has direct flights to Belarus.	
Kyrgyzstan	No	No	No	No	(European Union) Prague (PRG)	No	Yes		
Senegal	Yes	No	No	Yes		No	No		
Syria	No	No	No	No	(European Union) Athens (ATH) (European Union) Bucharest (OTP)	Yes	No	No	
Cambodia	No	No	No	No		No	No	Minsk (MSQ) is the only European airport with direct flights to Cambodia. Global and regional connecting hubs accessible from the EU include Dubai (DWC), Hong Kong (HKG), Bangkok (BKK) or Singapore (SIN), among others.	
Uruguay	No	No	No	Yes		No	No		
Suriname	No	Yes	No	No		No	No		
Tunisia	Yes	No	Yes	Yes		Yes	No		
Bangladesh	No	No	No	No	(European Union) Rome-Fiumicino (FCO)	Yes	No		
Nepal	No	No	No	No		No	No	No EU airport has direct flights to Nepal.	
Tajikistan	No	No	No	No		No	Yes	No EU airport has direct flights to Tajikistan.	
Nicaragua	No	No	No	No		No	No	No European airport has direct flights to Nicaragua. Global connecting hubs include Mexico City (MEX), Miami (MIA) or Houston (IAH).	
North Korea	No	No	No	No		No	No	No European airport has direct flights to North Korea. The only global connecting hub is Beijing (PEK).	
Malawi	No	No	No	No		No	No	No European airport has direct flights to Malawi. Global and regional connecting hubs include Addis Ababa (ABB) or Johannesburg (JNB), among others.	
Eritrea	No	No	No	No		No	No	No EU airport has direct flights to Eritrea	
Benin	Yes	No	No	No		No	No		
Honduras	No	No	No	Yes		No	No		
Liberia	No	No	No	No	(European Union) Brussels (BRU)	No	No		
Cuba	Yes	No	Yes	Yes		No	Yes		
Guatemala	No	No	No	Yes		No	No		
Iceland	Yes	Yes	Yes	No		Yes	No	Iceland is not an EU member but it's part of the EEA and the Schengen Area.	
South Korea	Yes	Yes	Yes	Yes		Yes	No		
Jordan	Yes	Yes	Yes	Yes		Yes	No		
Serbia	Yes	Yes	Yes	Yes		Yes	Yes		
Azerbaijan	Yes	Yes	Yes	Yes		Yes	Yes		
United Arab Emirates	Yes	Yes	Yes	Yes		Yes	Yes		
Panama	Yes	Yes	Yes	Yes		No	No		
Sierra Leone	No	No	No	No	(European Union) Brussels (BRU)	No	No		
Georgia	Yes	Yes	No	Yes		Yes	No		
Sri Lanka	Yes	No	Yes	No		Yes	Yes		
Curaçao (Netherlands)	No	Yes	No	No	(European Union) Amsterdam-Schiphol (AMS).	No	No	Curaçao is part of the Kingdom of Netherlands, but is not in the EU; it's part of the Overseas Countries and Territories.	
Togo	Yes	No	No	No		No	No		
Bosnia and Herzegovina	No	No	Yes	No		No	No		
Costa Rica	Yes	Yes	Yes	Yes		No	No		
Dominican Republic	Yes	Yes	Yes	Yes		No	No		
Switzerland	Yes	Yes	Yes	Yes		Yes	No		
Bhutan	No	No	No	No		No	No	No European airport has direct flights to Bhutan. Global and regional connecting hubs include Dubai (DXB), Delhi (DEL) or Bangkok (BKK), among others.	
Guinea-Bissau	No	No	No	No	(European Union) Lisbon (LIS)	No	No		
Taiwan	Yes	Yes	Yes	No		Yes	No		
Moldova	Yes	Yes	Yes	No		Yes	No		
Lesotho	No	No	No	No		No	No	No European airport has direct flights to Lesotho. The only active flight route to this country is from Johannesburg (JNB) airport.	
Armenia	Yes	No	Yes	No		No	Yes		
Solomon Islands	No	No	No	No		No	No	No European airport has direct flights to Solomon Islands. Global and regional connecting hubs include Fiji-Nadi (NAN) or Brisbane (BNE), among others.	
Albania	Yes	Yes	Yes	Yes		Yes	No		
Equatorial Guinea	Yes	No	No	No		No	No		
Burundi	No	No	No	No		No	No	No European airport has direct flights to Burundi. Global and regional connecting hubs include Addis Ababa (ABB) or Nairobi (NBO) airports.	
Haiti	No	No	No	No	(European Union) Pointe-à-Pitre (PTP) in Guadeloupe is the only EU airport with a direct flight.	No	No	No European airport has direct flights to Haiti. Miami (MIA) is the only global hub with a direct flight, and (European Union) Pointe-à-Pitre (PTP) in Guadeloupe is the only EU airport with a direct flight. (Note: Guadeloupe is a French Overseas Department and Region and thus a EU Outermost Region.)	
Rwanda	Yes	No	No	No		Yes	No		
North Macedonia	No	No	Yes	Yes		No	No		
Djibouti	Yes	No	No	No		No	No		
Belize	No	No	No	No		No	No	No European airport has direct flights to Belize. Global and regional connecting hubs include New York (JFK), Miami (MIA) or Panama (PTY) airports, among others.	
Israel	Yes	Yes	Yes	Yes		Yes	No		
El Salvador	No	No	No	Yes		No	No		
New Caledonia (France)	No	No	No	No		No	No	New Caledonia is part of France, but is not in the EU; it's part of the Overseas Countries and Territories. No European airport has direct flights to New Caledonia. Global and regional connecting hubs include Sydney (SYD) or Singapore (SIN) airports, among others.	
Fiji	No	No	No	No		No	No	No European airport has direct flights to Fiji. Global and regional connecting hubs include Los Angeles (LAX), Sydney (SYD), Singapore (SIN), Vancouver (YVR), Hong Kong (HKG) or Tokyo (NRT), among others.	
Kuwait	Yes	Yes	Yes	Yes		Yes	Yes		
Eswatini	No	No	No	No		No	No	No European airport has direct flights to Eswatini. Global and regional connecting hubs includeJohannesburg (JNB) or Cape Town (CPT).	
East Timor	No	No	No	No		No	No	No European airport has direct flights to Eswatini. Global and regional connecting hubs include Singapore (SIN) or Kuala Lumpur (KUL), among others.	
Bahamas	No	No	No	Yes		Yes	No		
Montenegro	Yes	Yes	Yes	Yes		No	No		
Vanuatu	No	No	No	No		No	No	No European airport has direct flights to Vanuatu. Global and regional connecting hubs include Sydney (SYD), Fiji-Nadi (NAN) or Auckland (AKL), among others.	
Qatar	Yes	Yes	Yes	Yes		Yes	Yes		
Gambia	No	Yes	No	No		No	No		
Jamaica	No	No	No	No		No	No	No EU airport has direct flights to Jamaica. London-Gatwick (LGW) is the only European airport with direct flights.	
Kosovo	No	No	Yes	No		No	No		
Lebanon	Yes	Yes	Yes	Yes		Yes	No		
Puerto Rico (United States)	No	No	No	Yes		No	No	Puerto Rico is an unincorporated territory of the US.	
French Southern Territories (France)	n/a	n/a	n/a	n/a		n/a	n/a	There isn't any active airport in the French Southern Territories. They are part of France, but are not in the EU; they are part of the Overseas Countries and Territories.	
Palestine	n/a	n/a	n/a	n/a		n/a	n/a	Palestine doesn't have any active airport.	
Brunei	No	No	No	No	(European Union) Hamburg (HAM)	No	No		
Trinidad and Tobago	No	Yes	No	No		No	No		
French Polynesia (France)	No	No	No	No		No	No	French Polynesia is part of France, but is not in the EU; it's part of the Overseas Countries and Territories. No European airport has direct flights to French Polynesia. (Note: Due to the COVID-19 pandemic, from March to April 2020, Air Tahiti Nui operated the longest scheduled passenger flight in History: a direct flight from Tahiti International Airport (PPT) to Paris-Charles de Gaulle (CDG).) Global and regional connecting hubs include Los Angeles (LAX), Tokyo (NRT) or Auckland (AKL), among others.	
Cape Verde	Yes	Yes	Yes	Yes		No	No		
Samoa	No	No	No	No		No	No	No European airport has direct flights to Samoa. Global and regional connecting hubs include Honolulu (HNL), Fiji-Nadi (NAN) or Auckland (AKL), among others.	
Mauritius	Yes	No	Yes	No		No	No		
Comoros	No	No	No	No	(European Union) Dzaoudzi (DZA) in Mayotte or La Reunion (RUN) are the only EU airports with a direct flight	No	No	No European airport has direct flights to Comoros. Global and regional hubs with direct flights include Nairobi (NBO) or Addis Ababa (ABB), and (European Union) Dzaoudzi (DZA) in Mayotte or La Reunion (RUN) are the only EU airport swith a direct flight. (Note: Mayotte and La Reunion are French Overseas Department and Regions and thus a EU Outermost Region.)	
Faroe Islands (Denmark)	No	No	No	No	(European Union) Copenhagen (CPH) (European Union) Brussels (BRU) (European Union) Gran Canaria (LPA)	No	No	The Faroe Islands are part of the Kingdom of Denmark, but are not in the EU. They constitute a Special Case.	
Hong Kong (China)	Yes	Yes	Yes	Yes		Yes	Yes		
São Tomé and Príncipe	Yes	No	Yes	No		No	No		
Kiribati	No	No	No	No		No	No	No European airport has direct flights to Vanuatu. Global and regional connecting hubs include Hawaii-Honolulu (HNL) or Fiji-Nadi (NAN).	
Bahrain	Yes	No	Yes	No		Yes	Yes		
Dominica	No	No	No	No		No	No	No European airport has direct flights to Dominica. Global and regional connecting hubs include New York (JFK) or Miami (MIA) airports, among others.	
Tonga	No	No	No	No		No	No	No European airport has direct flights to Tonga. Global and regional connecting hubs include Sydney (SYD), Fiji-Nadi (NAN) and Auckland (AKL).	
Singapore	Yes	Yes	Yes	No		Yes	No		
Micronesia	No	No	No	No		No	No	No European airport has direct flights to Micronesia. Guam (GUM) is the only airport with direct flights. (Note: Guam is an unincorporated territory of the USA.)	
Saint Lucia	No	No	No	No		No	No	No EU airport has direct flights to Saint Lucia. London-Gatwick (LGW) is the only European airport with direct flights.	
Palau	No	No	No	No		No	No	No European airport has direct flights to Palau. Global and regional connecting hubs include Taiwan (TPE), Hong Kong (HKG), Tokyo (NRT) or Manila (MNL) airports, among others.	
Seychelles	No	No	Yes	No		No	Yes		
Antigua and Barbuda	No	No	No	No		Yes	No	No EU airport has direct flights to Antigua and Barbuda	
Barbados	No	Yes	Yes	Yes		Yes	No		
Saint Vincent and the Grenadines	No	No	No	No		No	No	No European airport has direct flights to Saint Vincent and the Grenadines. Global and regional connecting hubs include New York (JFK), Miami (MIA) or Toronto (YYZ) airports, among others.	
Grenada	No	No	No	No		No	No	No European airport has direct flights to Grenada. Global and regional connecting hubs include New York (JFK), Miami (MIA) or Toronto (YYZ) airports, among others.	
Maldives	No	No	Yes	No		Yes	Yes		
Saint Kitts and Nevis	No	No	No	No		No	No	No European airport has direct flights to Saint Kitts and Nevis. Global and regional connecting hubs include New York (JFK), Miami (MIA) or Toronto (YYZ) airports, among others. Sint Maarten (SXM) airport has also a direct connection. (Note: Sint Maarten is part of the Kingdom of Netherlands, but is not in the EU; it's part of the Overseas Countries and Territories. It occupies the southern half of an island, the northern half of which is Saint Martin, a French Overseas Territory and Outermost Region of the EU.)	
Marshall Islands	No	No	No	No		No	No	No European airport has direct flights to the Marshall islands. Global and regional connecting hubs include Hawaii-Honolulu (HNL).	
Tuvalu	No	No	No	No		No	No	No European airport has direct flights to Tuvalu. Fiji (NAN) and Fiji (SUV) are the only airports with direct flights.	
Nauru	No	No	No	No		No	No	No European airport has direct flights to Nauru. Global and regional connecting hubs include Fiji-Nadi (NAN) or Brisbane (BNE).	
Sint Maarten (Netherlands)	Yes	No	No	No		No	No		
Saint Pierre and Miquelon (France)	No	No	No	No		No	No	Saint Pierre and Miquelon is part of France, but is not in the EU; it's part of the Overseas Countries and Territories. No European airport has direct flights, and global and regional connecting hubs include Montreal (YUL) or Halifax (YHZ), among others.	
Aruba (Netherlands)	No	Yes	No	No	(European Union) Amsterdam-Schiphol (AMS)	No	No	Aruba is part of the Kingdom of Netherlands, but is not in the EU; it's part of the Overseas Countries and Territories.	
Wallis and Futuna (France)	No	No	No	No		No	No	Wallis and Futuna are part of France, but are not in the EU; they are part of the Overseas Countries and Territories. No European airport has direct flights. Only Fiji (NAN) and Noumea-New Caledonia (NOU) have direct flights	
Total	75/175	57/175	63/175	51/175		88/174	53/174	29/174	

== Water transport ==
By 2013, about 74% of the interchange of goods between the European Union and the rest of the world as well as about a 37% of interchange between member states was carried out through its seaports. Maritime transport accounted for about €147 billion in 2013, or 1% of the EU GDP at the time.

The baby steps of a common European port policy were taken in the form of a 1985 memorandum by the EU Commission. It has since, via different white books, alternated bottom-top dynamics of harmonisation with top-bottom dynamics of unification. Vis-à-vis its transport policy, EU have defined operational concepts such as that of the 'motorways of the Sea' and that of 'co-modality'.

As of 2018, the largest ports in EU–28 in terms of shipping volume were Rotterdam, Antwerp, Hamburg, Bremerhaven, Valencia, Piraeus, Algeciras, Felixstowe, Barcelona, Marsaxlokk, Le Havre, Genoa, Gioia Tauro, Southampton and Gdansk.

Established by Regulation (EC) 1406/2002, the European Maritime Safety Agency (EMSA) is charged with reducing the risk of maritime accidents, marine pollution from ships and the loss of human lives at sea by helping to enforce the pertinent EU legislation.

== Railway transport ==
The European Railway Agency (ERA) has the mandate to create a competitive European railway area, by increasing cross-border compatibility of national systems, and in parallel ensuring the required level of safety. The ERA sets standards for European railways in the form of ERA Technical Specifications for Interoperability, which apply to the Trans-European Rail network.

The first EU directive for railways requires allowing open access operations on railway lines by companies other than those that own the rail infrastructure. It does not require privatisation, but does require the separation of infrastructure management and operations. The directive has led to reorganisations of many national railway systems.

The EU has also taken the initiative of creating the European Rail Traffic Management System (ERTMS), a single standard for train control and command systems, to enhance cross-border interoperability and the procurement of signalling equipment.

The EU 28 had:

- 8,952 km (5,563 mi) of high speed rail network at end of year 2018, with 1,686 km (1,048 mi) of line under construction
- 217,236 km (134,984 mi) of conventional railway lines in use including 117,348 km (72,917 mi) of electrified lines in 2017

Over the 2006–2019 period, railway freight transport peaked in EU–27 in 2007, with 416 billion tonne-kilometres. The targets of the European Green Deal contemplate a forceful shift from road to rail freight transport, which is underrepresented as of 2020.

In May 2022, some countries in the European Union strongly reduced the price for traveling on public transport, among others, because this is a relatively climate-friendly mode of transportation: Germany, Austria, Ireland, Italy. During summer of 2022, Germany reduced the price to Є9 per month. In some cities the price was cut by more than 90%. The national rail company of Germany committed to increase the number of trains and extend lines to new destinations. The use of trains significantly increased so that "ticket websites have crashed upon the release of the tickets."

Eurail and Interrail are tourist rail passes for international rail travel in Europe.

== Road transport ==
In 2012, the EU-28 had a network of 5 000 000 kilometres of paved road – compared to 5258 thousands for the US and 3610 thousands for China – including 73 200 kilometres of motorways – compared to 92 thousands for the US and 96.2 thousands for China.

In 2021, some vehicles still do not match the more recent European standards because they are too old: the average age of vehicles currently on the road in the EU, is 12 years, while countries have older vehicles: average vehicle age in Greece is 17 years, Estonia 16.8, Czechia 15.6, Lithuania 14.6, Poland and Hungary 14.5 and Slovakia 14.3. There are still 910 000 vehicles older than 30 years in circulation in Greece.

=== National policies ===
Germany, Spain and France possess the most extensive network of motorways exceeding 10,000 km each. This figure is more than double to any other European country. Similarly, their rail infrastructure surpasses 15,000 km. The total investment reached €6 billion for Spain and nearly double the amount for Germany and France. In terms of their population and territorial extension the Netherlands and Belgium have a better coverage and higher investment per square kilometre.

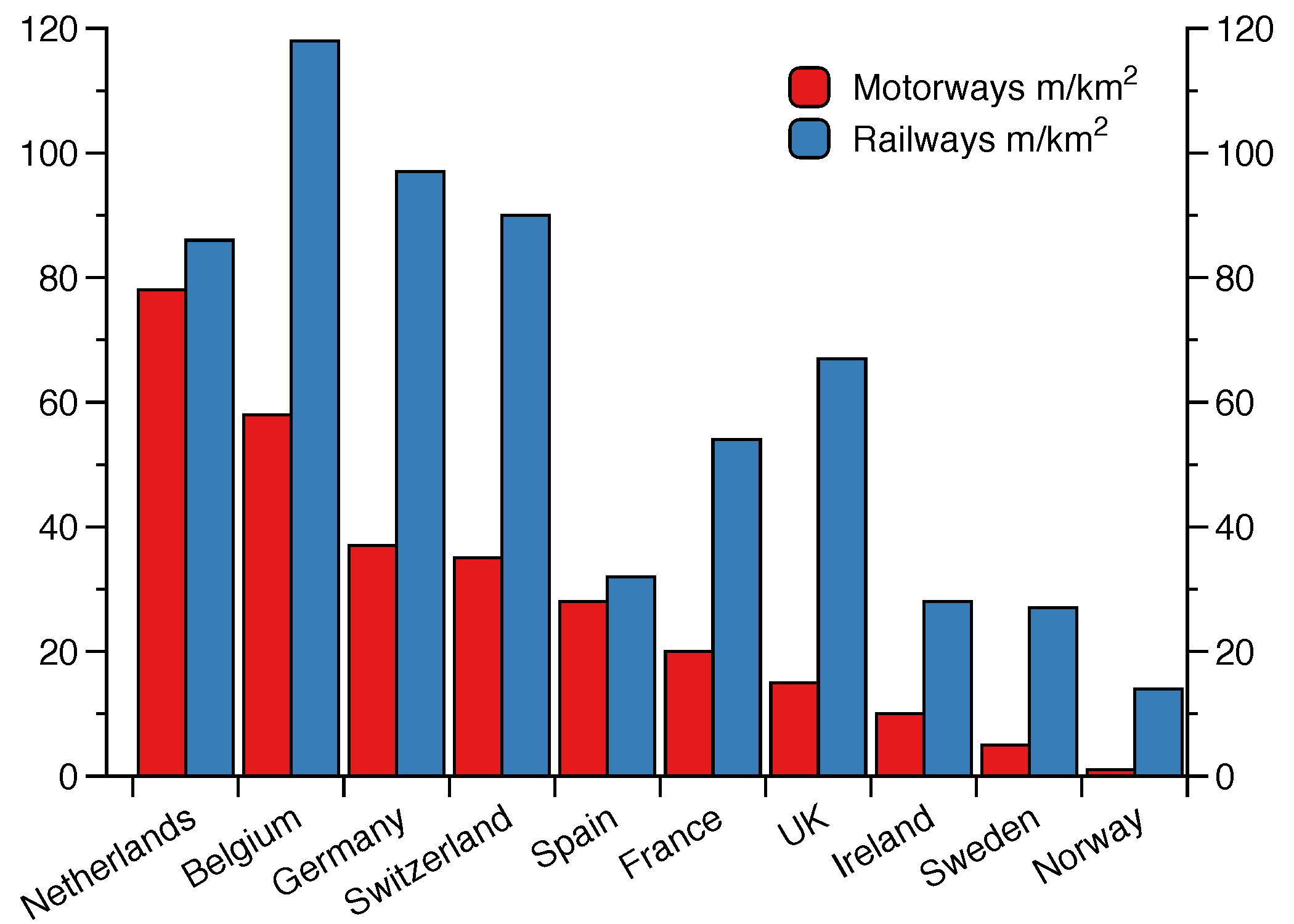
Rail and motorway extension per unit area for some European Countries.

=== EU policies ===
Road freight transport makes 73% of all inland freight transport activities in the EU in 2010.

Aim of the EU is to provided efficient, safe, secure and environmentally friendly land transport.

According to Union guidelines for the development of the trans-European transport network, "high-quality roads shall be specially designed and built for motor traffic, and shall be either motorways, express roads or conventional strategic roads."

EU laws include:

- access to the profession: Regulation (EC) n° 1071/2009 In 2011, 138,454 million tonnes kilometres was transported as international trade.
- driving working time: Directive 2002/15/EC and Regulation (EC) 561/2006: 9 hours daily driving period; weekly driving time may not exceed 56 hours; Daily rest period shall be at least 11 hours
- "smart" tachographs, required under Regulation (EU) 165/2014. "Smart" tachographs use technology to avoids unnecessary vehicle stops for checking
- common rules on distance-related tolls and time-based user charges (vignettes) for heavy goods vehicles (above 3.5 tonnes) for the use of certain infrastructures is defined in Directive 2011/76/EU

=== Motorways and Express road ===
For some topics, law applicable for roads is based on European directives and some international treaties such as European Agreement on Main International Traffic Arteries of 15 november 1975.

In European Union, a road can be considered as a "motorway" or also as an "express road".

In European union, the notion of express road is slightly less strict than the notion of motorway; according to the definition, "an express road is a road designed for motor traffic, which is accessible primarily from interchanges or controlled junctions and which prohibits stopping and parking on the running carriageway; and does not cross at grade with any railway or tramway track."

According to the CJEU, an environmental impact assessment should be performed on motorways, express roads and «construction of a new road of four or more lanes, or realignment and/or widening of an existing road of two lanes or less so as to provide four or more lanes, where such new road, or realigned and/or widened section of road would be 10 km or more in a continuous length».

Another position of the CJEU confirmed the first one and considers that an urban road around a city can be considered as an express road even if those roads do not form part of the network of main international traffic arteries or are located in urban areas when it matches with its definition provided in point II.3 of Annex II to the European Agreement on Main International Traffic Arteries (AGR), signed in Geneva on 15 november 1975.

=== Safety ===
2013 road fatalities per million inhabitants, source EU pocket book 2015 View chart definition.

Between 2001 and 2010, the number of road deaths in the EU decreased by 43%, and between 2010 and 2018 by another 21%. However, 25,100 people still died on EU roads in 2018 and about 135,000 were seriously injured.

The yearly cost of road crashes in the EU has been estimated to be around €280 billion or 2% of the GDP.

==== Safety plan ====
The Commission decided to base its road safety policy framework for the decade 2021 to 2030 on the Safe System approach.

For coordination, Europe has a "European Coordinator for road safety and related aspects of sustainable mobility".

KPI indicators
Indicator	Definition
Speed	Percentage of vehicles traveling within the speed limit
Safety belt	Percentage of vehicle occupants using the safety belt or child restraint system correctly
Protective equipment	Percentage of riders of powered two wheelers and bicycles wearing a protective helmet
Alcohol	Percentage of drivers driving within the legal limit for blood alcohol content (BAC)
Distraction	Percentage of drivers noT using a handheld mobile device
Vehicle safety	Percentage of new passenger cars with a Euro NCAP safety rating equal or above a predefined threshold
Infrastructure	Percentage of distance driven over roads with a safety rating above an agreed threshold
Post-crash care	Time elapsed in minutes and seconds between the emergency call following a collision resulting in personal injury and the arrival at the scene of the collision of the emergency services

== Space ==
The EU currently cooperates with the European Space Agency, which is expected to become an EU agency in 2020. One of their projects is the satellite navigation system Galileo.

== See also ==
- TRACECA
- Transport in Europe
- Trans-European Transport Networks
- Southeast Europe Transport Community
- Schengen Area
- Special Territories of the European Union
