= Trans-European Rail network =

EU designation for select high-priority train infrastructure

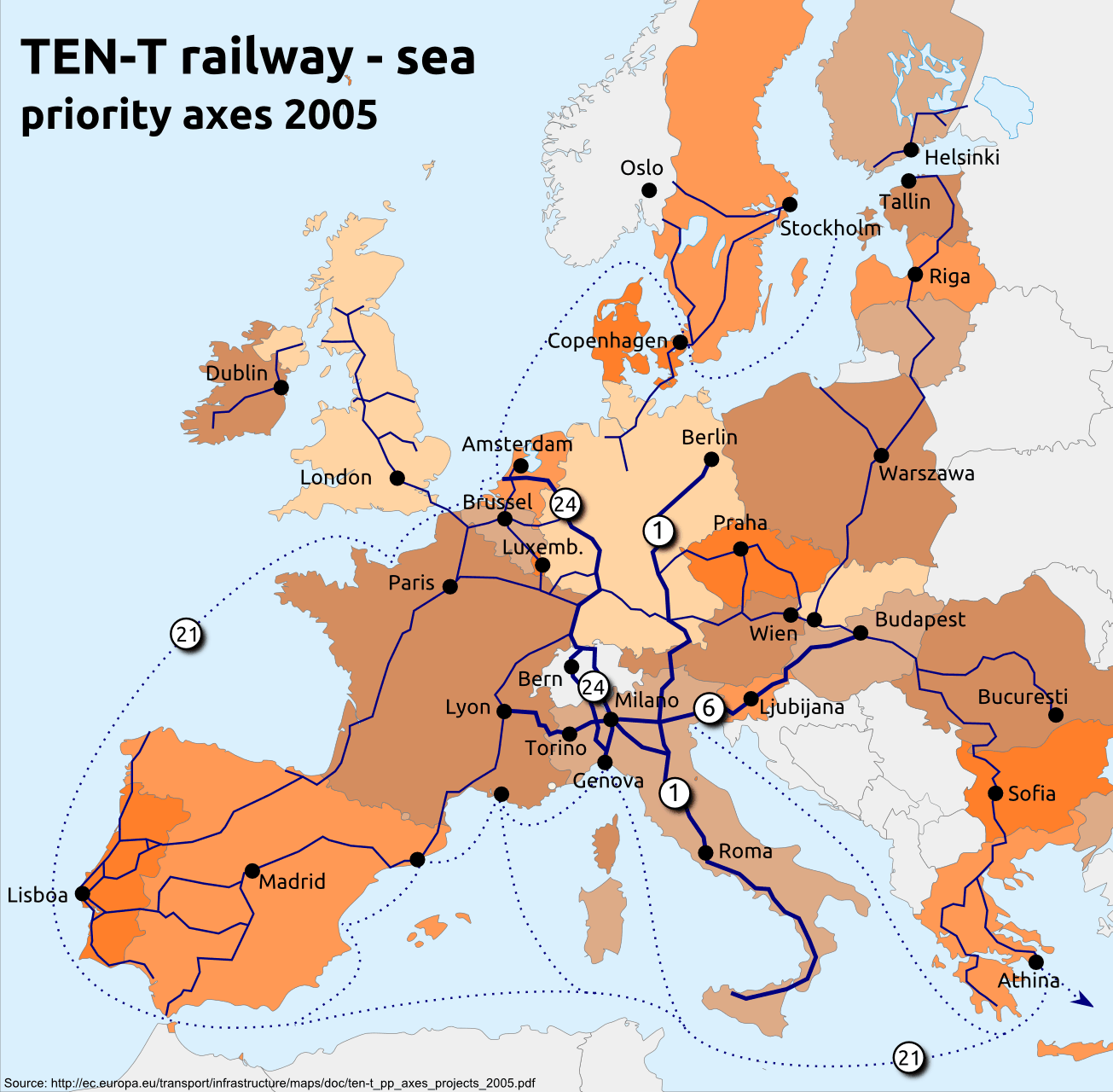
TEN-T railway, c.2005

The Trans-European Rail network is made up of the Trans-European high-speed rail network as well as the Trans-European conventional rail network. The rail network is one of a number of the European Union's Trans-European transport networks (TEN-T).

According to Article 10 of the Decision No 1692/96/EC of the European Parliament and of the Council of 23 July 1996 on Community guidelines for the development of the trans-European transport network, the rail network should include the infrastructures and the facilities which enable rail and road and, where appropriate, maritime services and air transport services to be integrated. In this regard, particular attention should be paid to the connection of regional airports to the network.

One or more of the following functions should be met by any component of the rail network:

- it should play an important role in long-distance passenger traffic
- it should permit interconnection with airports, where appropriate
- it should permit access to regional and local rail networks
- it should facilitate freight transport by means of the identification and development of trunk routes dedicated to freight or routes on which freight trains have a priority
- it should play an important role in combined transport
- it should permit interconnection via ports of common interest with short sea shipping and inland waterways

Standards for the rail network are set by decision of the Commission of the European Union based on a recommendation by the European Railway Agency, in the form of ERA Technical Specifications for Interoperability.

== See also ==
- Trans-European Transport Networks
- Trans-European Road network
- Trans-European high-speed rail network
- Trans-European conventional rail network
- Trans-European Inland Waterway network
- Motorways of the Sea
- Trans-European Seaport network
- Trans-European Airport network
