= Trans-European high-speed rail network =

Set of international 250+ km/h transport links

The Trans-European high-speed rail network (TEN-R), together with the Trans-European conventional rail network, make up the Trans-European Rail network, which in turn is one of a number of the European Union's Trans-European transport networks (TEN-T). It was defined by the Council Directive 96/48/EC of 23 July 1996.

The European Union council decision 2002/735/EC defines technical standards for interoperability of the system.

Operational high-speed lines in Europe

== Description ==
The aim of this EU Directive is to achieve the interoperability of the European high-speed train network at the various stages of its design, construction and operation.

The network is defined as a system consisting of a set of infrastructures, fixed installations, logistic equipment and rolling stock.

By definition of the EC decision, a high-speed line must have one of these three infrastructure characteristics:

- specially built high-speed lines equipped for speeds generally equal to or greater than 250 km/h (155 mph)
- specially upgraded high-speed lines equipped for speeds of the order of 200 km/h (124 mph)
- specially upgraded high-speed lines which have special features as a result of topographical, relief or town-planning constraints, on which the speed must be adapted to each case.

The rolling stock used on these lines must be compatible with the characteristics of the infrastructure.

Along important listed rail routes (TEN-T), the railway shall be of high speed type, either when new parts are built, or when upgrades are made. This creates a quality requirement on these projects.

== Corridors ==
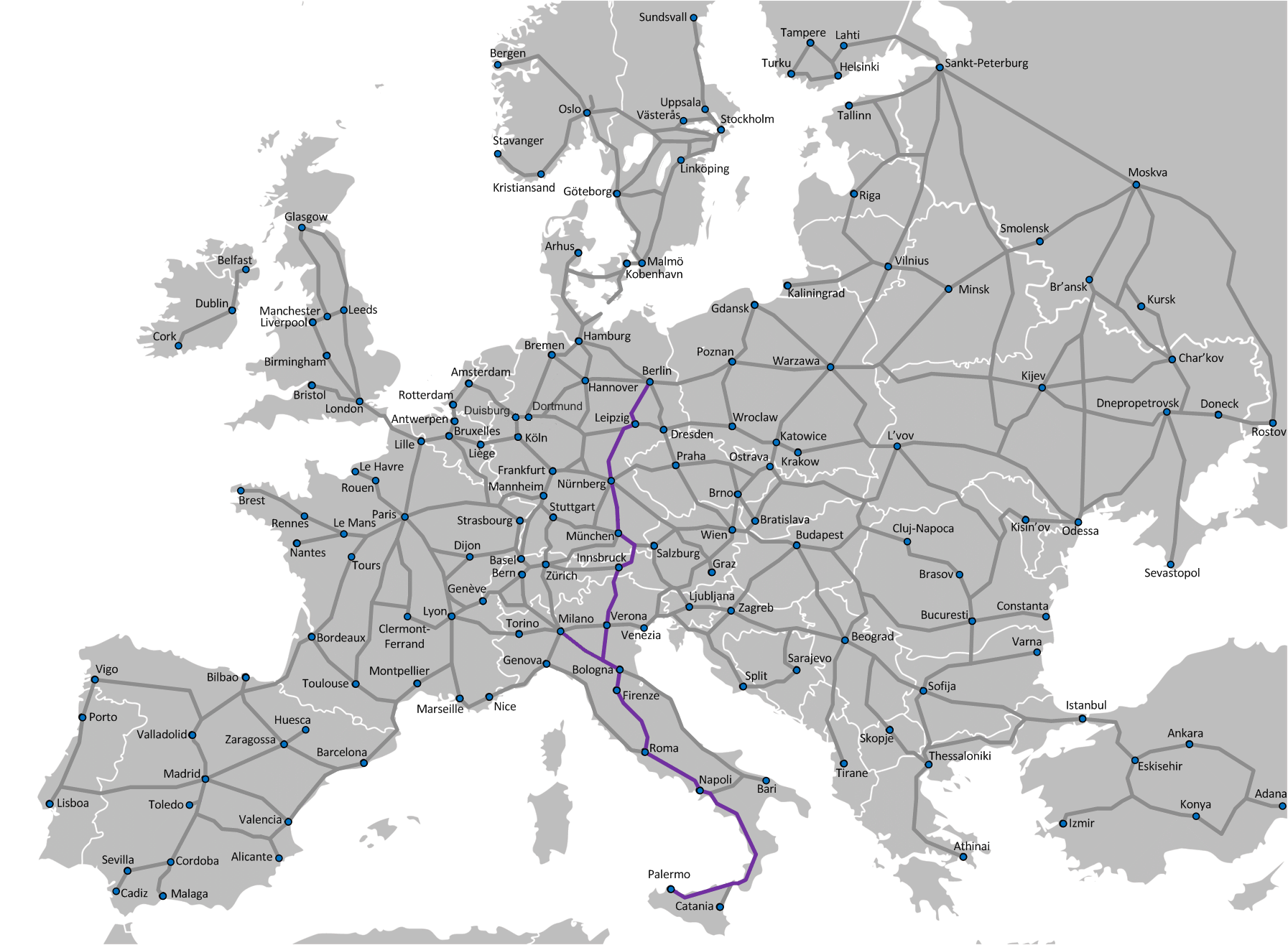
Berlin-Palermo axis

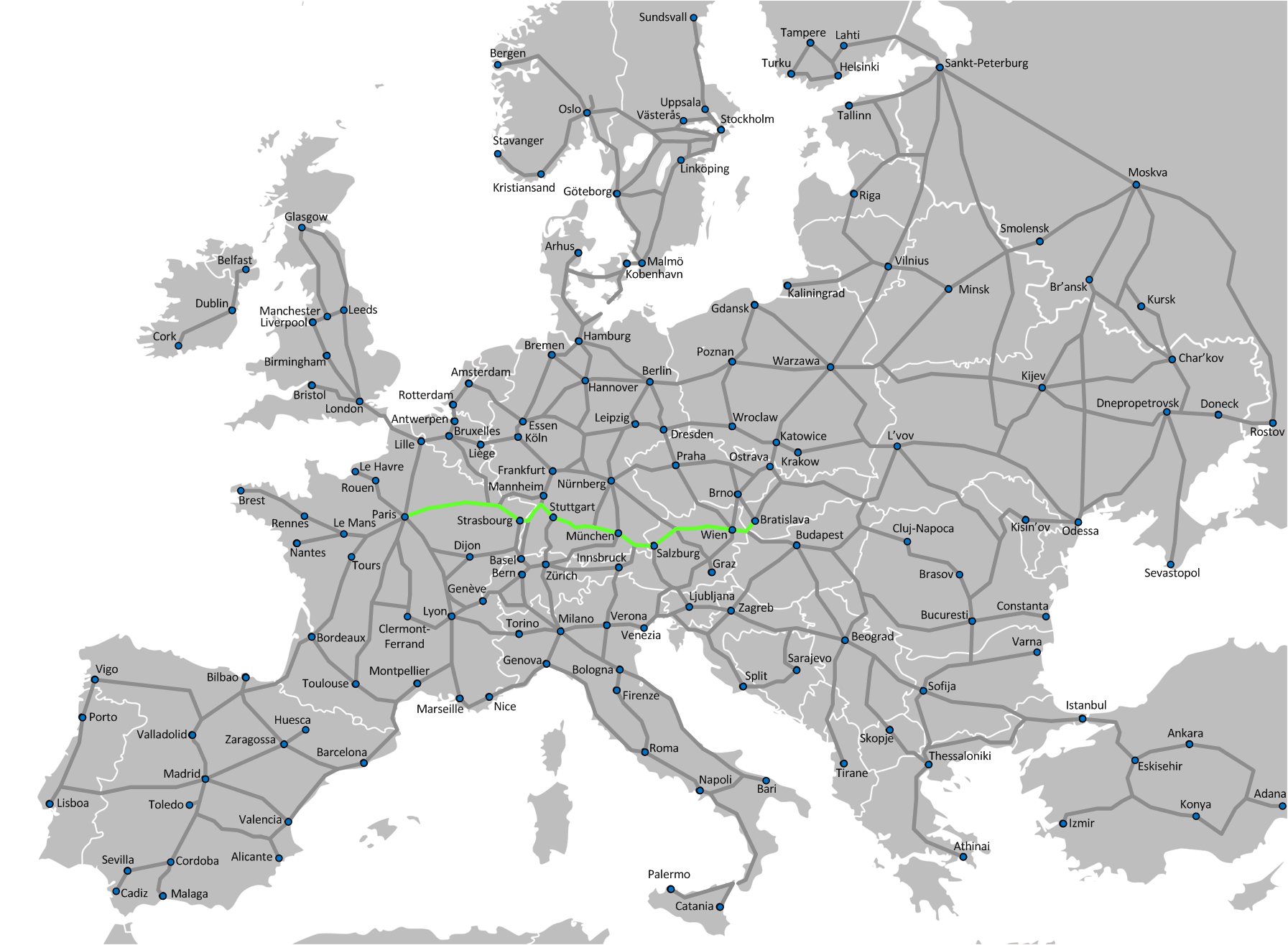
Magistrale for Europe

- Corridor 1 – Berlin–Palermo
- Corridor 2 – London, Paris, Amsterdam and Cologne to Brussels
- Corridor 3 – Lisbon–Madrid
- Corridor 4 – LGV Est
- Corridor 6 – Lyon–Budapest
- Corridor 7 – Paris–Bratislava

== See also ==
- High-speed rail in Europe
- Trans-European Transport Networks
- Trans-European Road network
- Trans-European Rail network
- Trans-European conventional rail network
- Trans-European Inland Waterway network
- Motorways of the Sea
- Trans-European Seaport network
- Trans-European Airport network
- Trans-European Combined Transport network
