= Lattanzi =

Lattanzi is an Italian surname. Notable people with the surname include:

- Chloe Lattanzi (born 1986), American actress and singer
- Flavia Lattanzi (1940-2026), Italian lawyer and judge
- Giorgio Lattanzi (born 1939), Italian judge
- Josh Lattanzi, American musician
- Lattanzio Lattanzi (died 1587), Italian Roman Catholic prelate
- Matt Lattanzi (born 1959), American actor and dancer
- Pasquale Lattanzi (born 1950), Italian footballer
- Tina Lattanzi (1897–1997), Italian actress

== Other ==
- Lattanzi Cucina Italiana, New York City Italian restauarant
