= Lini (name) =

Lini is a given name, nickname and surname. It may refer to:

- Ham Lin̄i (1951–2025), ni-Vanuatu politician, brother of Walter
- Motarilavoa Hilda Lin̄i (1954–2025), ni-Vanuatu politician and a chief, sister of Walter
- Oscar Lini (1928–2016), Italian footballer
- Walter Lini (1942–1999), ni-Vanuatu Anglican priest and first Prime Minister of Vanuatu
- Lini Evans (born 1976), Canadian singer and actress
- Karoline Lini Söhnchen (1897–1978), German diver
