= Civitavecchia =

- Comune
- Comune di Civitavecchia
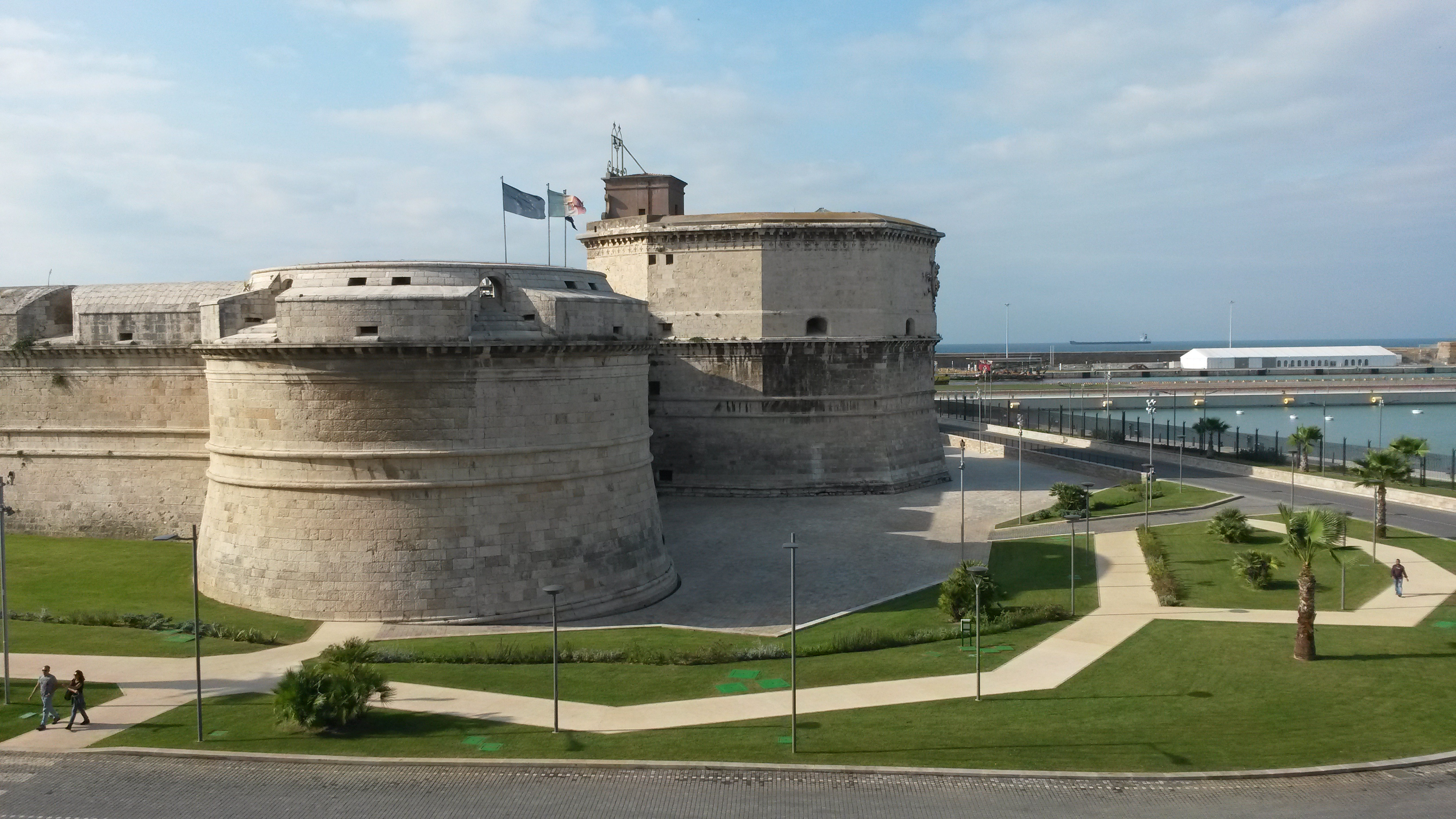
- Civitavecchia fort and harbour

- Flag Coat of arms

- Location in the Metropolitan City of Rome

- Location within Italy Location within Lazio
- Country: Italy
- Region: Lazio
- Metropolitan city: Rome
- Frazioni: Aurelia, La Scaglia

Government
  - Mayor: Marco Piendibene (PD)

Area
  - Total: 73.74 km^{2} (28.47 sq mi)

Population (2026)
  - Total: 51,359
  - Density: 696.5/km^{2} (1,804/sq mi)
- Time zone: UTC+1 (CET)
  - Summer (DST): UTC+2 (CEST)
- Patron saint: Saint Fermina
- Website: www.comune.civitavecchia.rm.it

Civitavecchia (Italian: [ˌtʃivitaˈvɛkkja], lit. 'Ancient Town'; Latin: Centumcellae, and later, Civitas Vetus) is a city, major sea port and comune (municipality) on the Tyrrhenian Sea, in the Metropolitan City of Rome Capital in the region of Lazio in Italy, 60 kilometres (37 miles) west-northwest of Rome. It has 51,359 inhabitants.

Civitavecchia's harbour is formed by two piers and a breakwater on which stands a lighthouse.

== History ==
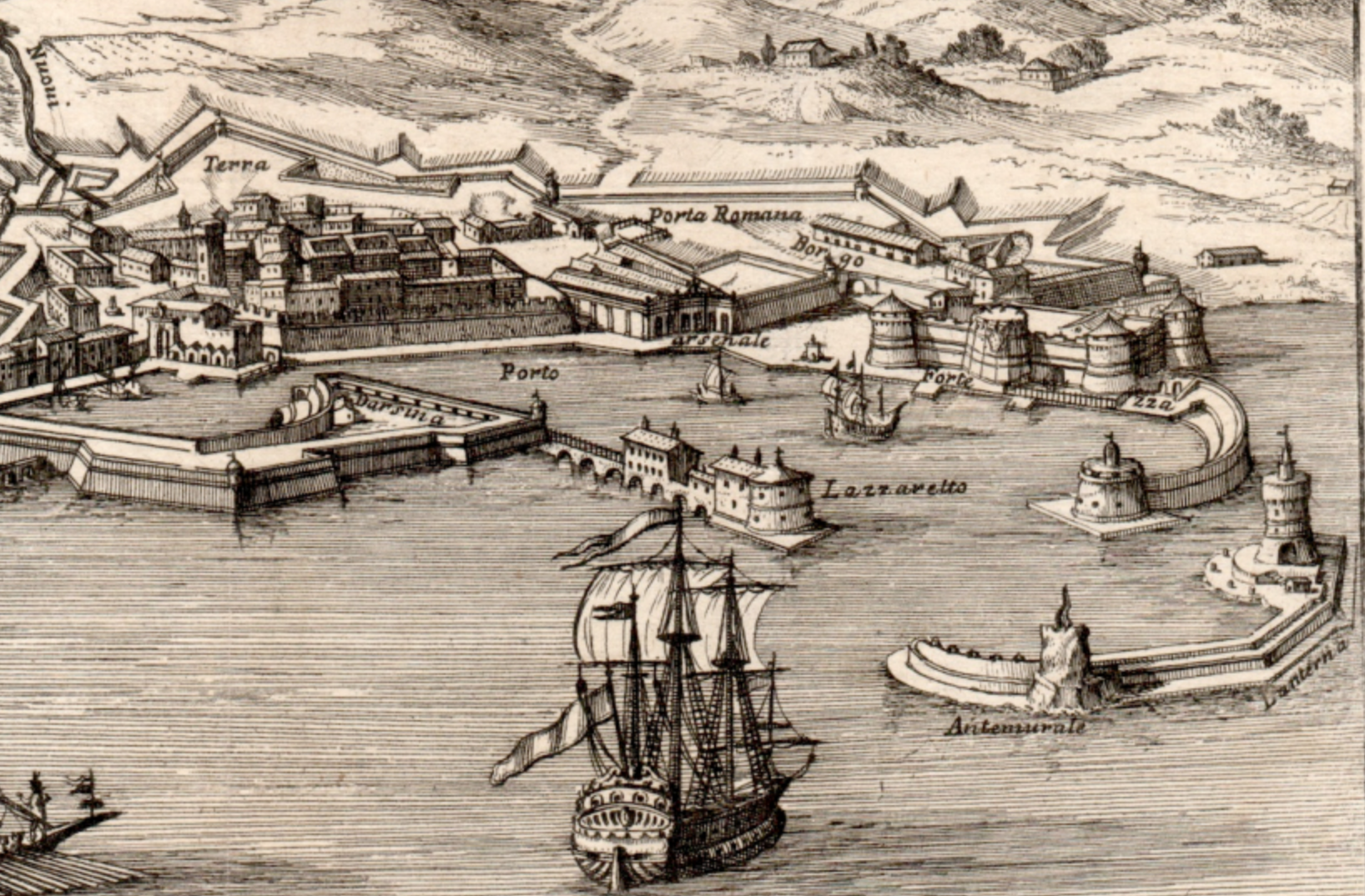
Civitavecchia in 1699 showing buildings of Roman harbour

=== Etruscan era ===
The whole territory of Civitavecchia is dotted with the remains of Etruscan tombs and it is likely that in the centre of the current city a small Etruscan settlement thrived. The Etruscan necropolis of Mattonara, not far from the Molinari factory, is almost certainly from the 7th–6th century BC and was most likely connected with the nearby necropolis of Scaglia. An ancient port formed by small parallel basins capable of accommodating single vessels was still visible at the end of the 19th century near Forte Michelangelo.

An Etruscan settlement on the hill of Ficoncella can still be seen. The first baths of the settlement were built there before 70 BC, and known by the Romans as Aquae Tauri.

=== Roman era ===
The nearby monumental baths at Terme Taurine were built originally in the Roman Republican era, possibly by Titus Statilius Taurus, prefect of Rome.

The harbour was greatly enlarged by the Emperor Trajan at the beginning of the 2nd century and became known as Centum Cellae, probably due to the many vaulted "cells" forming the harbour wall, some of which can still be seen. The first occurrence of the name Centum Cellae is from a letter by Pliny the Younger in AD 107. It has been suggested that the name could instead refer to the centum ("hundred") halls of the extensive villa of Trajan which was nearby. The harbour was probably built by Trajan's favourite architect, Apollodorus of Damascus (who also built the harbour of Ancona). The town was also known as Centum Cellae and was developed from the same time. Trajan's sumptuous villa pulcherrima (most beautiful, according to Pliny) must have been built at the same time but traces have yet to be found, although the Terme Taurine baths and the large cistern nearby are likely to have been included. Pliny was summoned by Trajan to his villa there for an exceptional meeting there of the consilium principis (advisory council) which normally took place in Rome, and which indicates the status of the villa as an imperial residence. The villa was also used later by the young Marcus Aurelius, probably in the years 140-145 who built a vivarium there and also in 173 by Commodus.

Inscriptions from between the 2nd and 3rd centuries from a cemetery near the Roman harbour prove the presence of classiari, sailors from the navy, and also of a noble class. They also tell of the number and type of ships which were detachments of the fleets of Ravenna and of Misenum.

In 251 Pope Cornelius was imprisoned in Centumcellae during the persecutions of Decius and his successor Trebonianus Gallus and died there in 253.

In the 4th and 5th centuries the city and port became even more prosperous and busy, as Rutilius Namatianus described it in 414 as it became an important port of Rome due to the silting of Ostia.

In the 530s, Centumcellae was a Byzantine stronghold and until 553 the city suffered in the wars between the Goths and the Byzantines.

=== Later history ===
It became part of the Papal States in 728 and Pope Gregory III refortified Centumcellae. As the port was raided by the Saracens in 813–814, 828, 846 and finally in 876, a new settlement in a more secure place was therefore built by order of Pope Leo IV as soon as 854. In the meantime, however, the inhabitants returned to the old town by the shore in 889 and rebuilt it, giving it the name Civitas Vetus. The Popes gave the settlement as a fief to several local lords, including the Count Ranieri of Civitacastellana and the Abbey of Farfa, and the Di Vico, who held Centumcellae in 1431. In that year, pope Eugene IV sent an army under cardinal Giovanni Vitelleschi and several condottieri (Niccolò Fortebraccio, Ranuccio Farnese and Menicuccio dell'Aquila among them) to recapture the place, which, after the payment of 4,000 florins, became thenceforth a full Papal possession, led by a vicar and a treasurer.

The place became a free port under Pope Innocent XII in 1696 and by the modern era was the main port of Rome. The French Empire occupied it in 1806.

The French novelist Stendhal served as consul for a time in Civitavecchia.

On 16 April 1859, the Rome and Civitavecchia railway was opened for service.

The Papal troops opened the gates of the fortress to the Italian general Nino Bixio in 1870. This permanently removed the port from Papal control.

During World War II, the Allies launched several bombing raids against Civitavecchia, which damaged the city and inflicted several civilian casualties. On June 27, 1944, two American soldiers from the 379th Port Battalion, Fred A. McMurray and Louis Till, allegedly raped two Italian women in Civitavecchia and murdered a third. McMurray and Till were subsequently both executed by the United States Army by hanging five months later.

== Geography ==
=== Climate ===
Civitavecchia experiences a hot-summer Mediterranean climate (Köppen climate classification Csa).

Climate data for Civitavecchia (1991–2020 normals, extremes 1945–present)
Month	Jan	Feb	Mar	Apr	May	Jun	Jul	Aug	Sep	Oct	Nov	Dec	Year
Record high °C (°F)	18.3 (64.9)	22.2 (72.0)	22.8 (73.0)	25.4 (77.7)	30.6 (87.1)	34.2 (93.6)	35.2 (95.4)	37.9 (100.2)	33.0 (91.4)	27.6 (81.7)	26.6 (79.9)	20.8 (69.4)	37.9 (100.2)
Mean daily maximum °C (°F)	13.5 (56.3)	13.8 (56.8)	15.5 (59.9)	17.8 (64.0)	21.7 (71.1)	25.4 (77.7)	28.0 (82.4)	28.6 (83.5)	25.4 (77.7)	22.0 (71.6)	18.2 (64.8)	14.7 (58.5)	20.4 (68.7)
Daily mean °C (°F)	10.4 (50.7)	10.5 (50.9)	12.3 (54.1)	14.7 (58.5)	18.3 (64.9)	22.2 (72.0)	24.7 (76.5)	25.3 (77.5)	22.2 (72.0)	19.0 (66.2)	15.2 (59.4)	11.6 (52.9)	17.2 (63.0)
Mean daily minimum °C (°F)	7.5 (45.5)	7.3 (45.1)	9.0 (48.2)	11.5 (52.7)	15.1 (59.2)	18.8 (65.8)	21.4 (70.5)	21.9 (71.4)	18.9 (66.0)	15.9 (60.6)	12.2 (54.0)	8.6 (47.5)	14.0 (57.2)
Record low °C (°F)	−4.4 (24.1)	−2.9 (26.8)	−2.6 (27.3)	1.6 (34.9)	5.3 (41.5)	10.2 (50.4)	14.0 (57.2)	13.0 (55.4)	10.4 (50.7)	5.8 (42.4)	1.0 (33.8)	−2.4 (27.7)	−4.4 (24.1)
Average precipitation mm (inches)	66.4 (2.61)	63.3 (2.49)	73.2 (2.88)	57.9 (2.28)	43.9 (1.73)	27.5 (1.08)	13.6 (0.54)	17.5 (0.69)	72.6 (2.86)	113.7 (4.48)	116.5 (4.59)	93.1 (3.67)	759.1 (29.89)
Average precipitation days (≥ 1 mm)	6.9	6.1	6.0	6.2	5.0	2.8	1.3	1.6	4.6	6.8	9.0	7.8	64.0
Average relative humidity (%)	73.7	73.1	74.9	75.4	75.1	74.7	73.3	73.4	73.4	73.4	75.9	72.6	74.2
Average dew point °C (°F)	6.2 (43.2)	6.1 (43.0)	8.2 (46.8)	10.7 (51.3)	14.3 (57.7)	18.0 (64.4)	20.1 (68.2)	20.6 (69.1)	17.4 (63.3)	14.9 (58.8)	11.1 (52.0)	7.0 (44.6)	12.9 (55.2)
Source 1: NOAA
Source 2: Temperature estreme in Toscana (extremes)

== Demographics ==
Historical population
Year	Pop.	±%
1871	9,718	—
1881	11,636	+19.7%
1901	15,220	+30.8%
1911	17,064	+12.1%
1921	20,635	+20.9%
1931	29,124	+41.1%
1936	27,477	−5.7%
1951	32,870	+19.6%
1961	38,138	+16.0%
1971	44,188	+15.9%
1981	49,389	+11.8%
1991	51,201	+3.7%
2001	50,032	−2.3%
2011	51,229	+2.4%
2021	51,880	+1.3%
Source: ISTAT

As of 2026, the population is 51,359, of which 48.2% are males, and 51.8% are females. Minors make up 14.2% of the population, and seniors make up 25.1%.

=== Immigration ===
As of 2025, immigrants make up 7.5% of the population. The 5 largest foreign countries of birth are Romania, Bangladesh, China, Albania, and Germany.

== Main sights ==
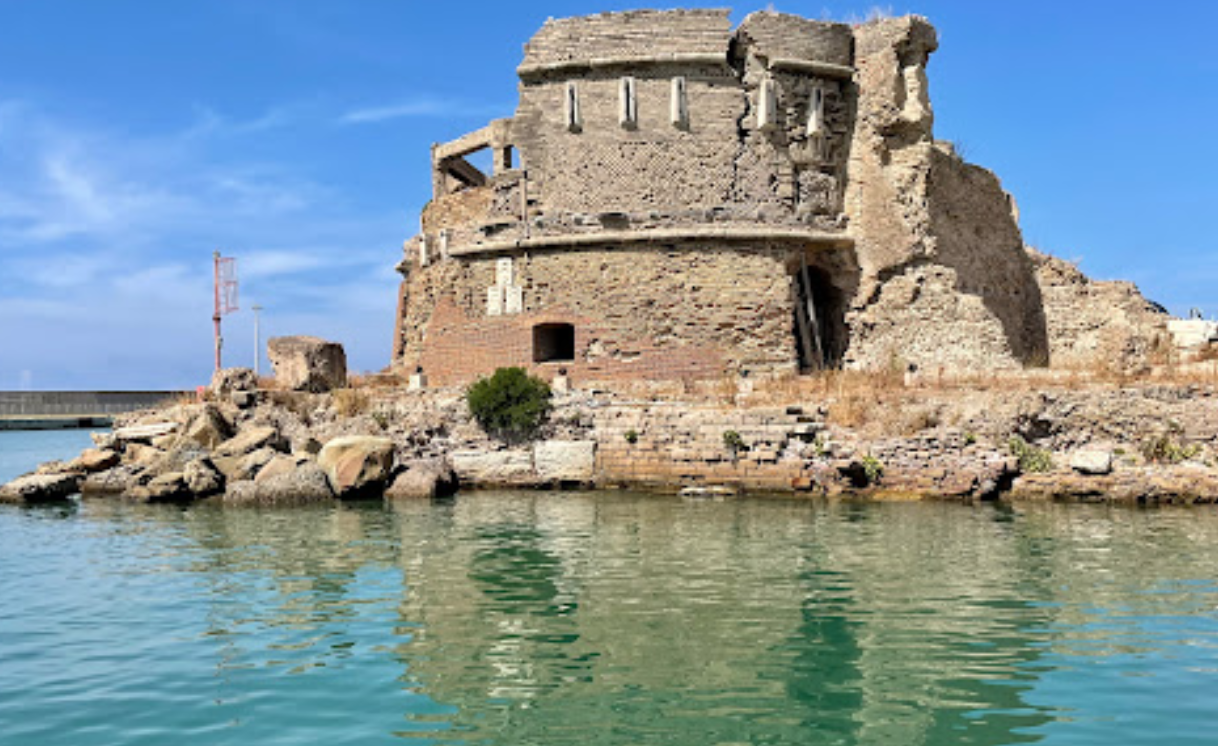
Roman Torre di Lazzaretto

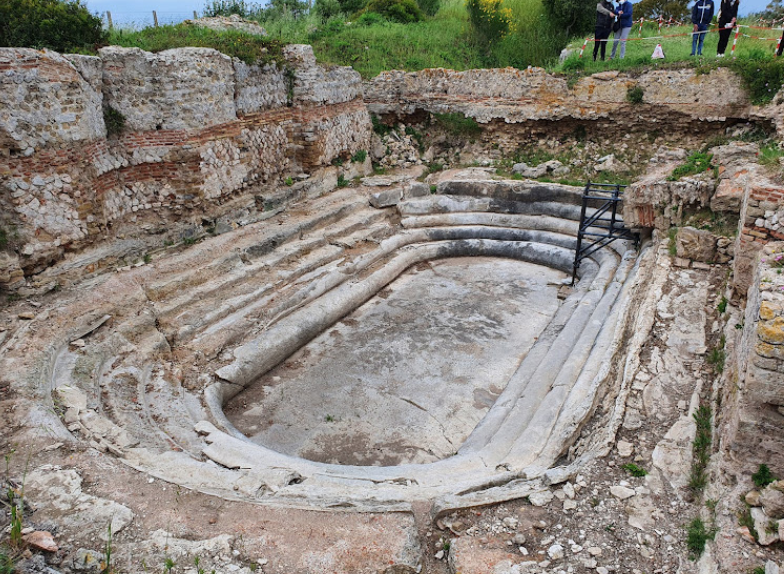
Roman baths of Aquae Tauri

=== Roman city ===
The modern inner harbour (darsena) rests on ancient foundations many of which can be seen and whose shape is still very much the same as it was in Trajan's time. It had a curved breakwater on the southern side and a straight one to the north with arches to reduce the waves which still exist.

The Torre di Lazzaretto is the only remaining Tower of four large Roman round towers that served as beacons around the ancient harbour. Remains of warehouses can be seen between the large basin and the inner harbour (darsena), still used during the Middle Ages.

A section of the Via Aurelia running along the harbour, 6 m wide and at a depth of 3 m, was excavated. Some of the Roman city wall is visible in the basement of the Fraternity of the Banner in the Piazza Leandra. Remains of an aqueduct and a large cistern, possibly part of Trajan's villa, are preserved.

North of the city at Ficoncella are the Terme Taurine baths frequented by Romans and still popular with the Civitavecchiesi. The modern name stems from the common fig plants among the various pools.

Also at Ficoncella nearby are the baths of Aquae Tauri from the earlier Etruscan and early Roman settlement. A larger building of 160x100 m enclosed the baths and is being excavated.

=== Other sights ===
The massive Forte Michelangelo was first commissioned from Donato Bramante by Pope Julius II, to defend the port of Rome. The upper part of the "maschio" tower, however, was designed by Michelangelo, whose name is generally applied to the fortress. Pius IV added a convict prison, and the arsenal, designed by Bernini, was built by Alexander VII.

Major cruise lines start and end their cruises at this location, and others stop for shore excursion days to visit Rome and the Vatican, ninety minutes away.

== Economy ==
Civitavecchia is today a major cruise and ferry port, the main starting point for sea connection from central Italy to Sardinia, Sicily, Tunis and Barcelona. Fishing has a secondary importance.

The city is also the seat of two thermal power stations. The conversion of one of them to coal has raised the population's protests, as it is feared it could create heavy pollution.

== Transport ==
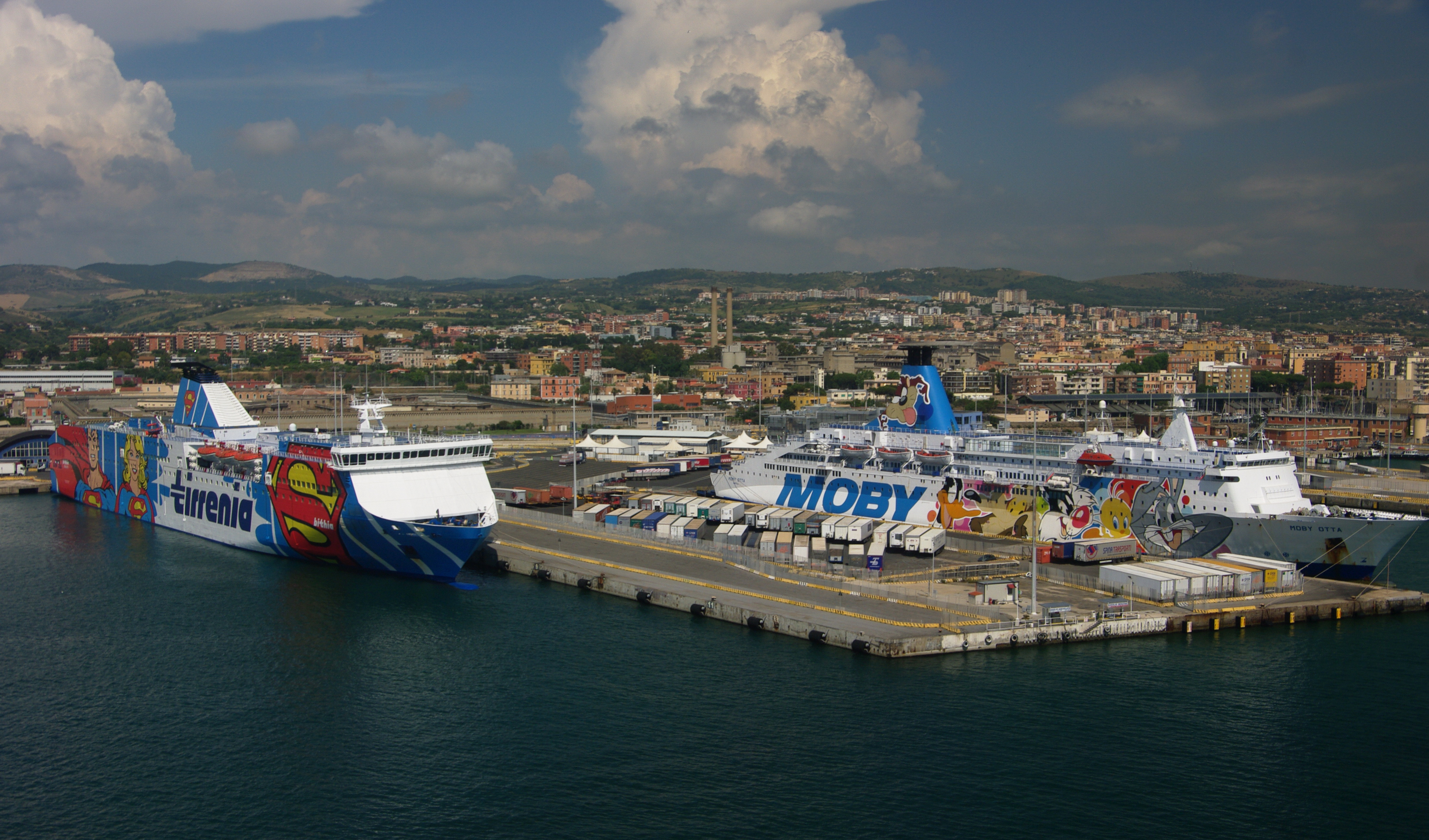
View of the port

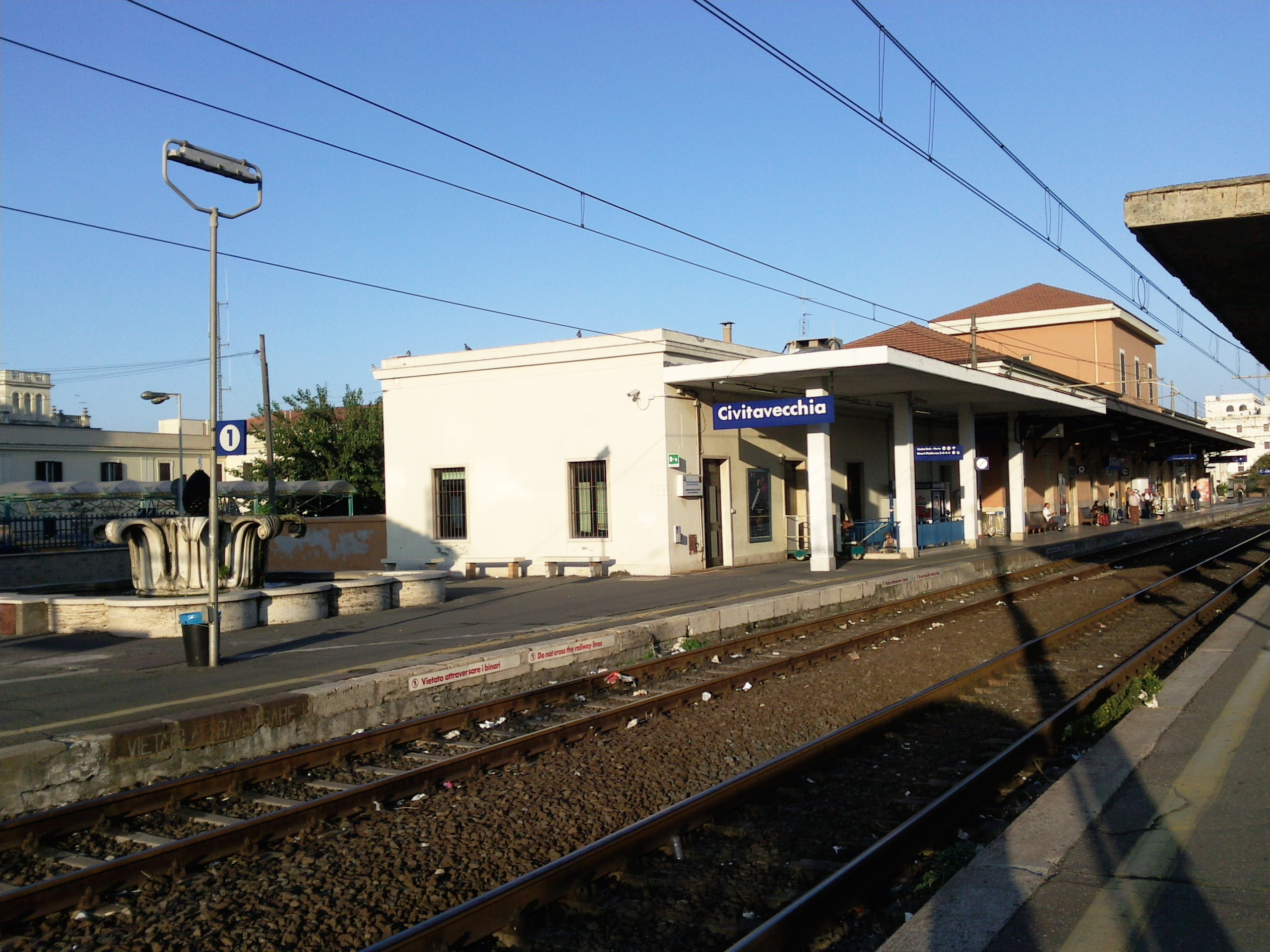
View of station platforms

The Port of Civitavecchia, also known as "Port of Rome", is an important hub for the maritime transport in Italy, for goods and passengers. Part of the "Motorways of the Sea", it is linked to several Mediterranean ports and represents one of the main links between Italian mainland to Sardinia.

Civitavecchia railway station, opened in 1859, is the western terminus of the Rome–Civitavecchia railway, which forms part of the Pisa–Livorno–Rome railway. A short line linking the town center to the harbour survived until the early 2000s. It counted two stations: Civitavecchia Marittima, serving the port, and Civitavecchia Viale della Vittoria.

Civitavecchia is served by the A12, an unconnected motorway linking Rome to Genoa and by the State highway SS1 Via Aurelia, which also links the two stretches. The town is also interested by a project regarding a new motorway, the Civitavecchia-Venice or New Romea, nowadays completed as a dual carriageway between Viterbo and Ravenna (via Terni, Perugia and Cesena) and commonly known in Italy as the Orte-Ravenna.

== Education ==
The commune has multiple preschools, primary schools, junior high schools, and high schools. Polo Universitario di Civitavecchia is located in the city.

== International relations ==
=== Twin towns – sister cities ===
Civitavecchia is twinned with:

- Amelia, Italy
- (Palestine) Bethlehem, Palestinian Authority, since 2000
- Ishinomaki, Japan
- Nantong, China

== Notable people ==
- Manuele Blasi (b. 1980), football player
- Silvio Branco (b. 1966), professional boxer
- Andrea Casali (1705–1784), Rococo painter
- Alessio De Sio (1968), journalist, city mayor from 2001 to 2005, director of communication of "Hitachi" Rail Italy ex "AnsaldoBreda"
- Raffaele Giammaria (b. 1977), racing driver
- Marco Mocci (b. 1982), racing driver
- Pasquale Lattanzi (b. 1950), former football player
- Oscar Lini (1928-2016), football player
- Ermanno Palmieri (1921-1982), football player
- Giancarlo Peris (b. 1941), former track athlete
- Roberto Petito (b. 1971), road bicycle racer
- Giulio Saraudi (1938–2005), boxer
- Eugenio Scalfari (b. 1924), journalist, founder of la Repubblica
- Emiliano Sciarra (b. 1971), game designer
- Roldano Simeoni (b. 1948), former water polo player
- Vittorio Tamagnini (1910–1981), boxer

== See also ==
- Arsenal of Civitavecchia
- Civitavecchia Calcio
- Civitavecchia di Arpino
- Civitavecchia, Cachar district, Assam, India (spelt as "Chibita Bichia" by the locals).
