= Lyon-Budapest railway axis =

High-speed train lines between France, Italy, Slovenia and Hungary

The Lyon–Budapest railway axis (officially designated as Railway axis Lyon-Trieste-Divača/Koper-Divača-Ljubljana-Budapest-Ukrainian border) is a project of the Trans-European high-speed rail network (TEN-R), which involves the creation of a 1,638-kilometre-long (1,018 mi) high-speed rail line between Lyon and Budapest, finally heading to the Ukrainian border.

== Sections ==
=== Lyon-Turin ===
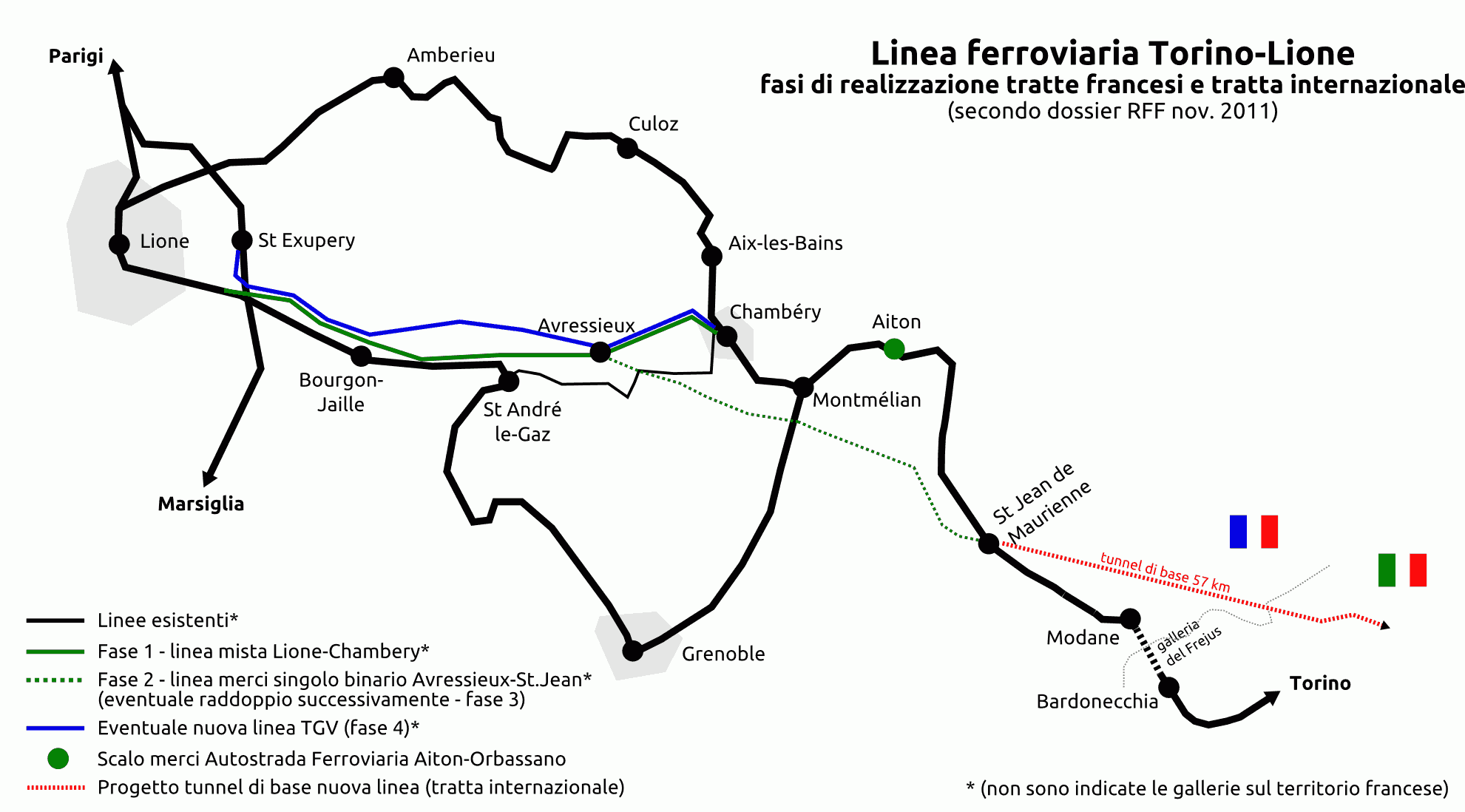
A map showing the French and international route of the new line compared to the existing one

The Turin–Lyon high-speed railway is a planned 270 km (170 mi)-long, 220 km/h (140 mph) railway line that will connect the two cities and link the Italian and French high-speed rail networks. The core of the project is a base tunnel measuring 57.5 km crossing the Alps between the Susa valley in Italy and Maurienne in France. The tunnel will be the longest rail tunnel in the world, being longer than the Gotthard Base Tunnel, which measures 57.1 km, and it represents one third of the estimated overall cost of the project.

== See also ==
- Mont d'Ambin Base Tunnel
- Main line for Europe
- Trans-European high-speed rail network
