= Ermanno Palmieri =

Italian footballer (1921-1982)

Personal information
- Date of birth: 9 September 1921
- Place of birth: Civitavecchia, Italy
- Date of death: 1982
- Position: Striker

Senior career*
Years	Team	Apps	(Gls)
1941–1943	Civitavecchiese		
1945–1948	Civitavecchiese		
1948–1949	Roma	1	(0)
1949–1950	Catanzaro	13	(4)
- * Club domestic league appearances and goals

Ermanno Palmieri (born 9 September 1921 in Civitavecchia; died in 1982) was an Italian professional football player. He played one match in the Serie A for A.S. Roma in the 1948/49 season.
