= Alessio De Sio =

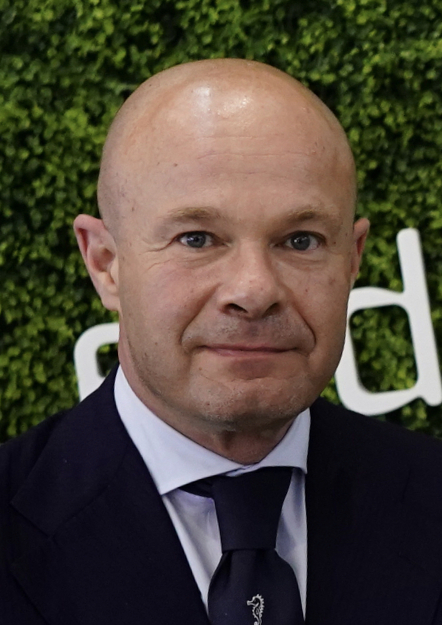

Personal details
- Born: 31 May 1968 (age 58) Viterbo, Italy
- Profession: Lobbyst, Journalist/Politician

Alessio De Sio (born 31 May 1968) is a global lobbyist, journalist and former politician. Between September 2017 and December 2022, he was Chief Institutional and Communication Officer ZTE Europe Region & ZTE Italia.

ZTE Italia Headquarter is the European hub of ZTE Corporation, one of the larger Tlcs company in the world.

He started his career as Publicist journalist registered in the National Order of Journalists.

His journalistic career began in 1986 at the editorial office of Il Tempo in Civitavecchia, where he was a collaborator. In 1992 he became Deputy Editor-in-Chief of the Civitavecchia Chronicle and in 1993 he continued his career at the Provincial Editorial Office of Il Tempo.

Elected Provincial Councillor of Rome in December 1998, he ran in 2001 for the local government of Civitavecchia, where he was elected Mayor for Forza Italia.

From 2003 to 2005, he was President of the Civitavecchia Environmental Observatory, which monitors pollutants in the area, with particular reference to emissions from the two thermoelectric power stations, the port, vehicle traffic and the district landfill. From 2001 to 2005, he was also President of the Consorzio Universitario di Civitavecchia, a structure comprising the University of Rome "La Sapienza" and the University of Viterbo "Tuscia", as well as the Fondazione Cassa di Risparmio di Civitavecchia and the Municipality of Civitavecchia.

From 2003 to 2005 he joined the National Association of Italian Municipalities, ANCI in the Presidential Committee with responsibility for relations with municipalities with energy plants. From 2006 to 2010, he was a consultant to Eni S.p.A. for communications and external relations, with the task of supervising the organisation of events and the preparation of company presentations. From 2006 to 2009 he was appointed Member of the Board of Directors of Acquirente Unico S.p.A., a company owned by the Ministry of Economic Development.

From July 2008 to May 2009, at the Presidency of the Council of Ministers - Department of National Civil Protection, he was chosen as a collaborator of the Undersecretary of State Guido Bertolaso, responsible for relations with institutions and local authorities, and for the coordination of separate collection and waste emergency in Campania.

From 2009 to 2011 he was a member of the "Nucleo di Valutazione esperti sull'impiego dei Fondi CIPE", at the Economic planning Department, Presidency of the Council of Minister.

In 2010 he was hired, first as Consultant for the communication aspects of Finmeccanica. and then as Head of Relations with Central and Local Institutional Bodies for Selex Elsag SpA - Finmeccanica. In July 2012 he moved to AnsaldoBreda S.p.A. as Director of External and Institutional Relations.

Appointed Senior Vice President for External and Institutional Relations at AnsaldoBreda S.p.A, in November 2015 he took on the role of Senior Vice President External and Institutional Relations for Hitachi Rail Italy S.p.A.

In August 2017 he was hired in ZTE Italia as Public Relations Director. From December 2019 to December 2022 he held the position of Chief Institutional & Communication Officer at ZTE Italia.

De Sio has established an art and science award to the memory of the Italian scientist "Guglielmo Marconi".

In 2021, he won the global "Best Branding Person" award, established by Zte Corporation (3).
