= Terme Taurine =

Coordinates: 42.10947245°N 11.83549948°E

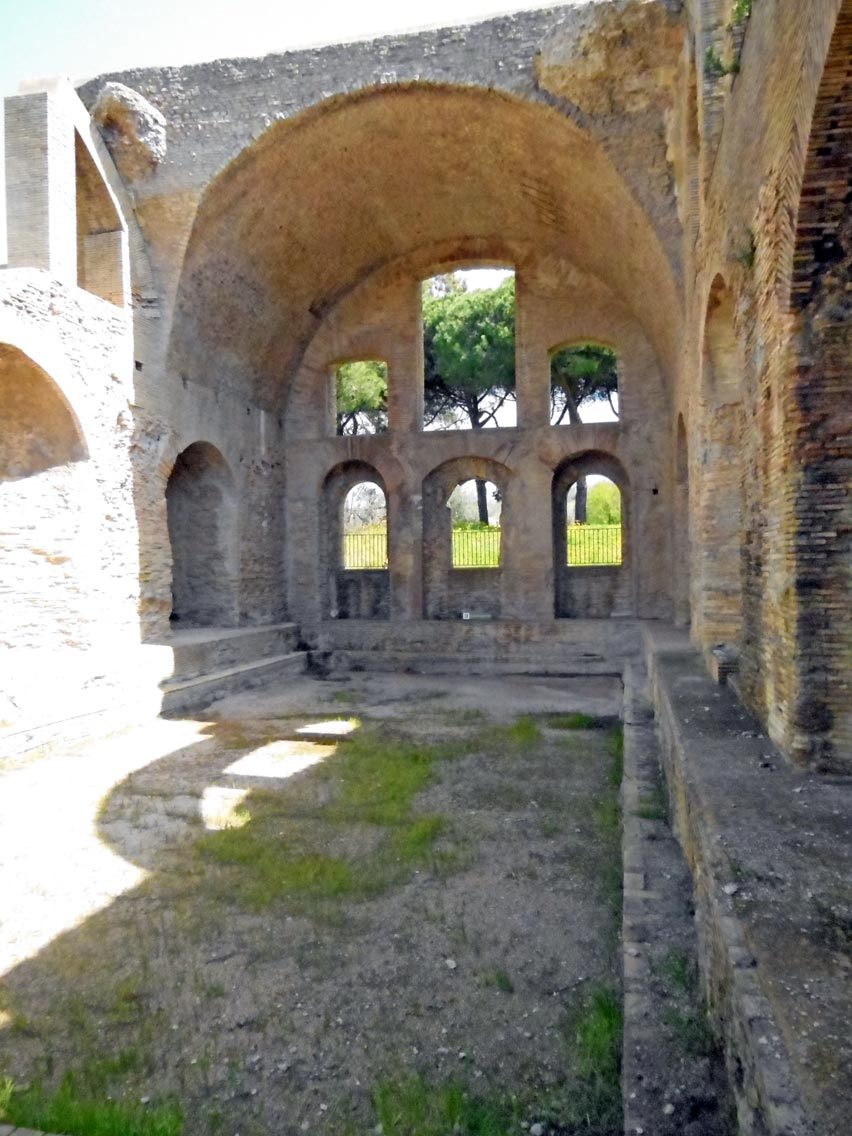
- Interactive map of Terme Taurine
- Type: Bathhouse
- Location: Civitavecchia, Italy

Site notes
- Public access: Open

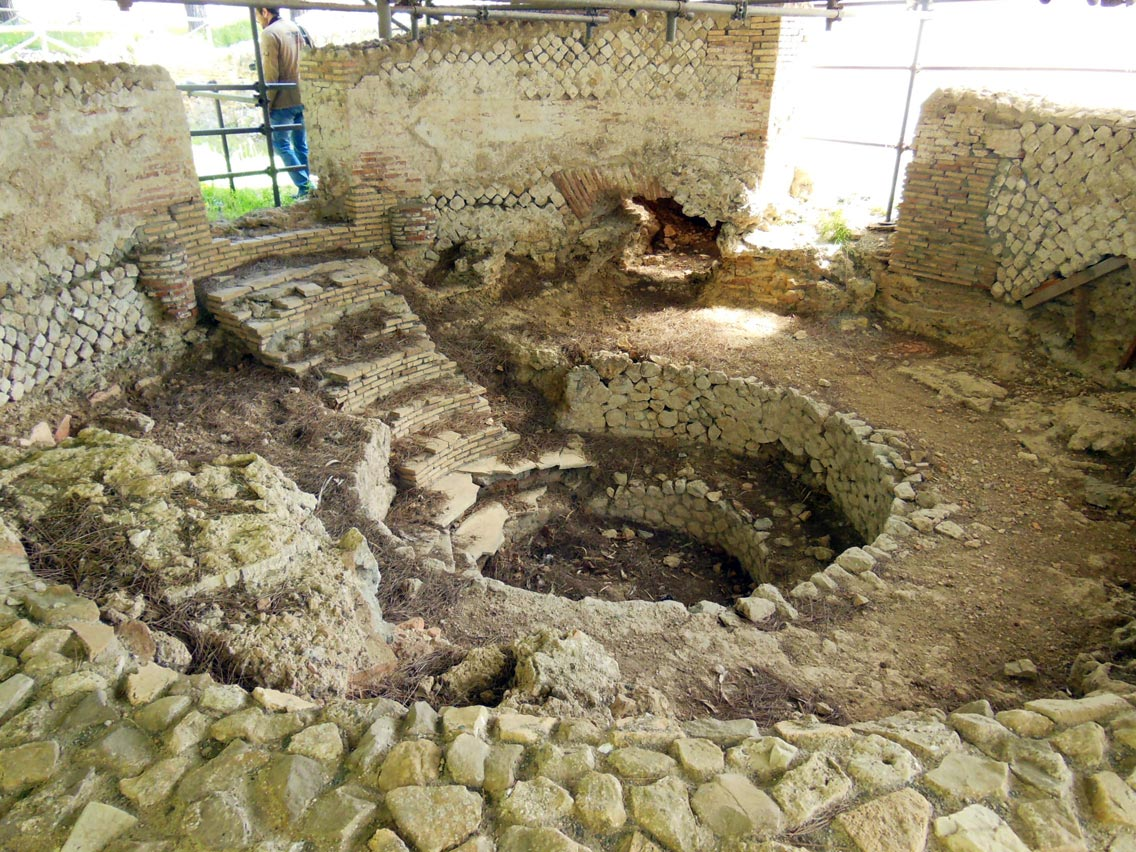
Laconicum (dry heat room)

Terme Taurine, also known as the Taurine Baths, is a large elaborate ancient Roman baths complex located about 4 km east of the city of Civitavecchia.

They are also known as the Baths of Trajan as they may form part of Trajan's villa of Centumcellae nearby, due to their enormous size relative to the town and to their elaborate marble decoration. The limits of the site have yet to be explored which may clarify their history.

The baths are now in an archaeological park.

== History ==
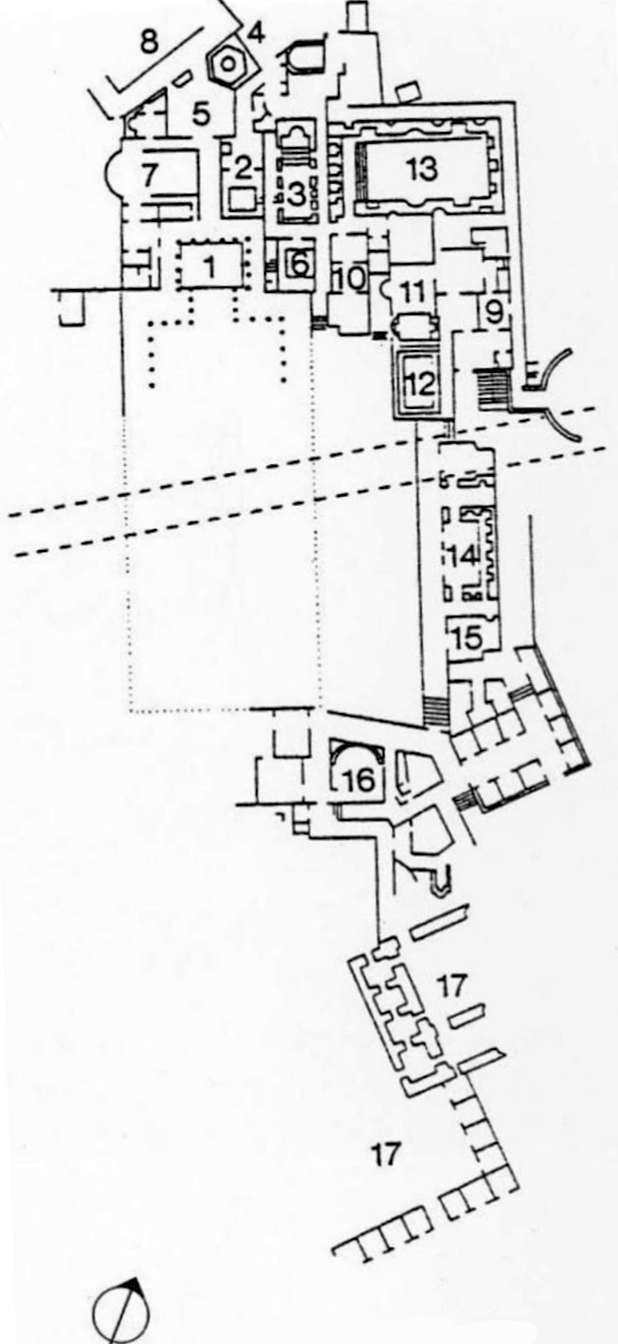
Terme Taurine plan (Rooms 1-9: Republican era, 10-13: Trajan era, 14-17: Hadrian era)

Terme Taurine was first established on a hill overlooking Civitavecchia during the Roman Republican era in 86 BC. They were built over thermal sulphurous springs a few km from the later port of Centumcellae developed by Trajan (r. 98 to 117 AD). They were also about 1 km from the earlier baths of the settlement of Aquae Tauri.

The complex was greatly expanded by Roman emperors Trajan and Hadrian (r. 117 - 138) from 123 to 136. The baths became a popular stop-over site for visitors to the nearby port.

It may have been named after Titus Statilius Taurus, prefect of Rome and builder of the first amphitheatre there, who fought with Augustus at Actium and had a patron role.

In 416, Rutilius Namatianus wrote:

There the wells are not spoiled by a brackish flavour, nor is the water coloured and hot with fuming sulphur: the pure smell and delicate taste make the bather hesitate for what purpose the waters should better be used

Terme Taurine remained in use until the mid 6th century, and Pope Gregory the Great writes of them in 593. The wars between the Goths and Byzantine Empire led to them being looted. Much of the marble walling of the baths was stripped off, and the baths fell into disuse. In 1770, the Papal States began to excavate parts of the site and built an Italian-style garden nearby, which can still be seen.

The baths reopened to the public in 2020 after being restored. Local notables have proposed Terme Taurine be nominated as a UNESCO world heritage site.

=== Notable visitors ===
Commodus upon finding his bathwater tepid while visiting Terme Taurine ordered the stoker to be thrown into the furnace although a sheep skin was secretly substituted to replicate the burnt smell. Roman Poet Rutilius Claudius Namatianus visited the baths in 416 and described them in his travelogue.

== The Site ==
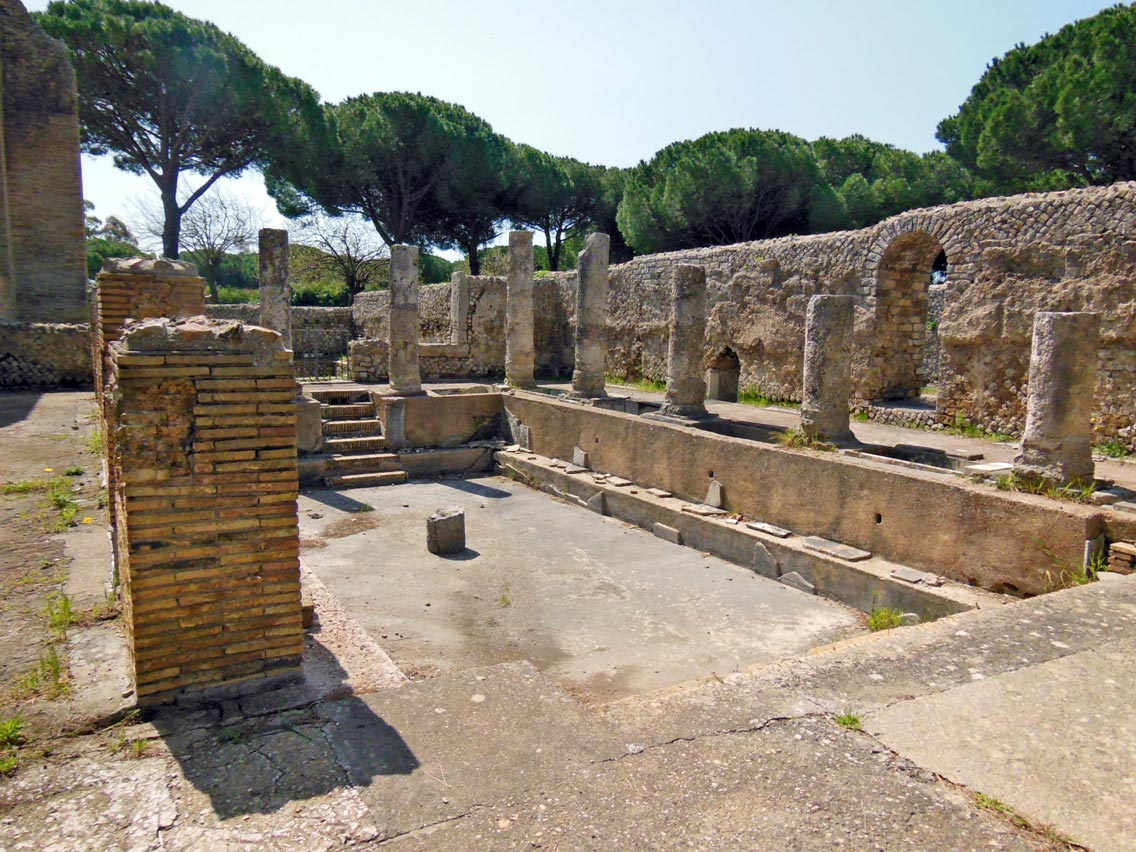
Republican Caldarium

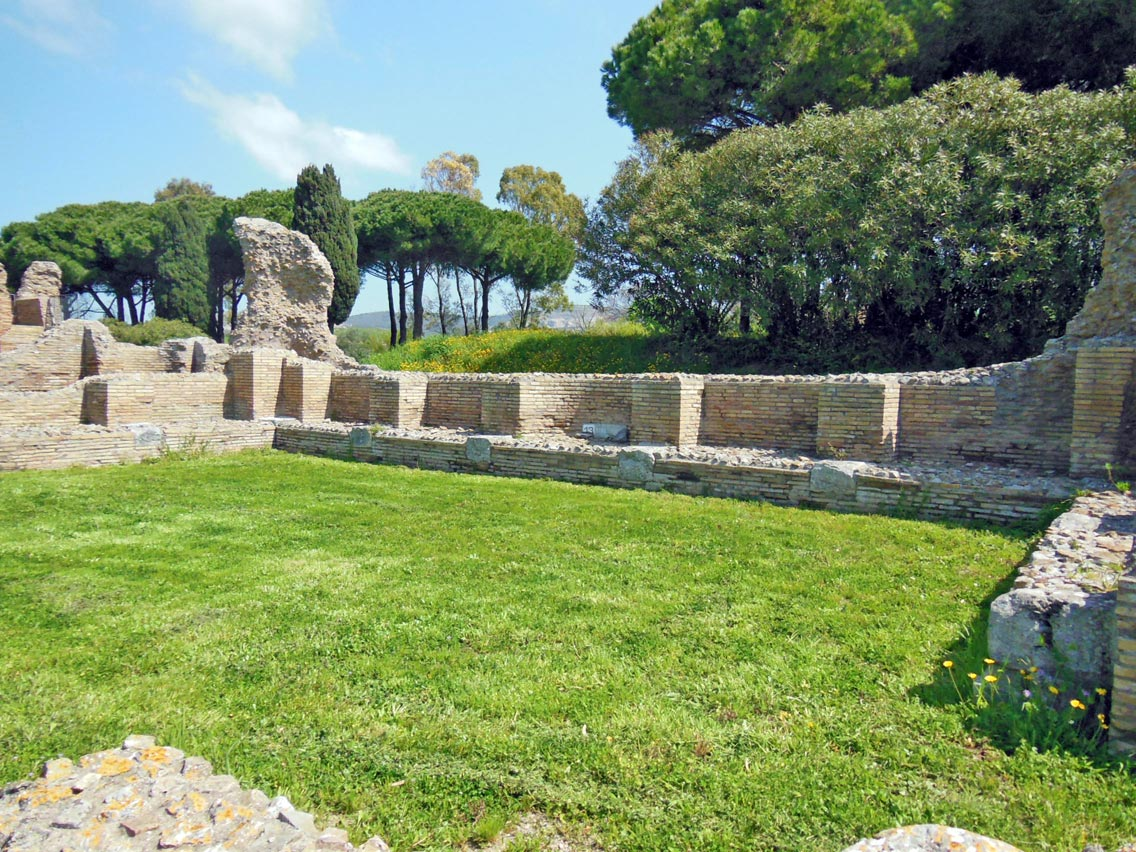
Library of imperial baths

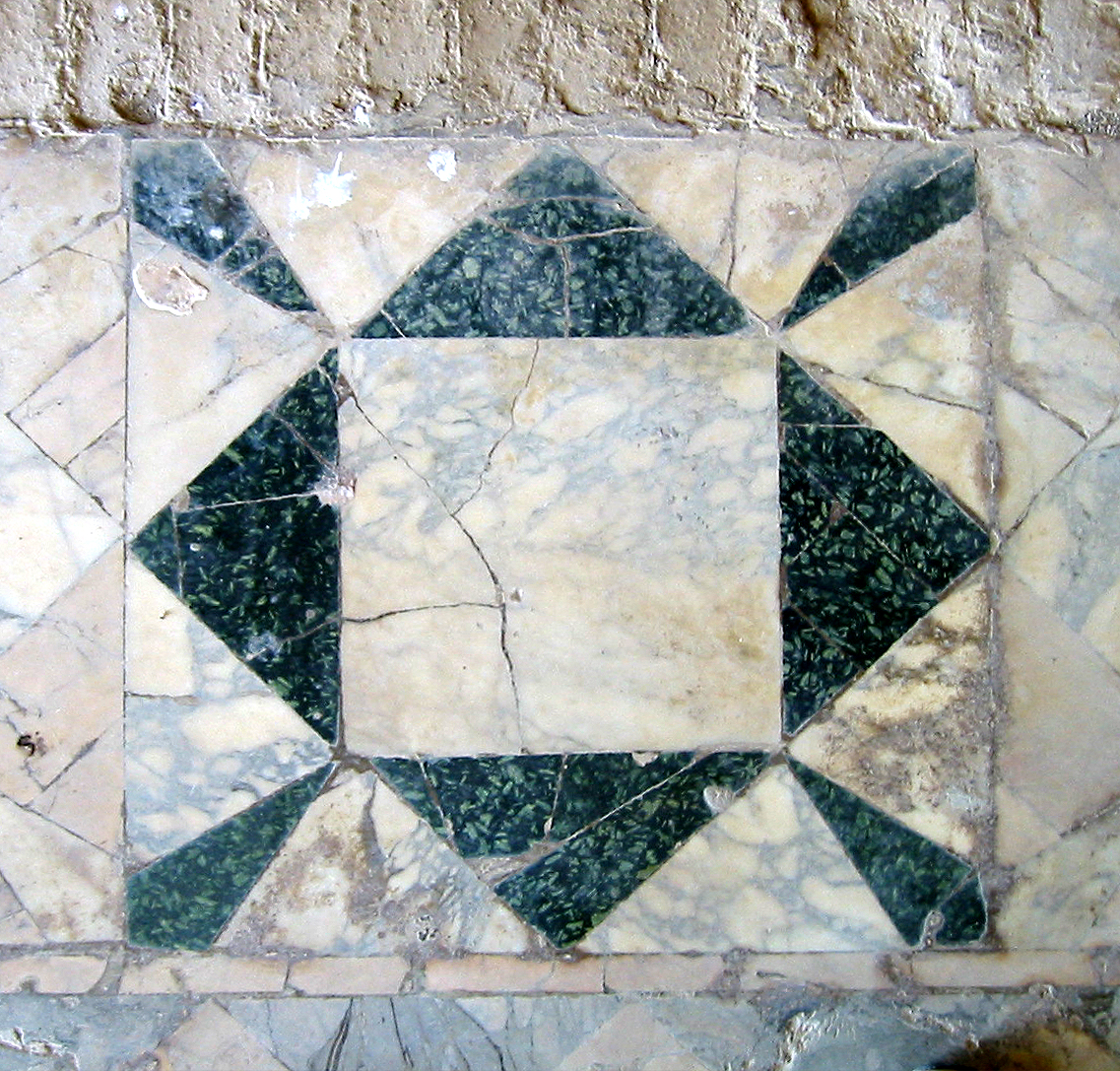
Opus Sectile floor with green porphyry

The site has two separate large baths areas: the republican and the later imperial baths. The baths featured changing rooms, and hot and cold pools. Several of these pools and the mosaics adorning them can still be visited.

=== Republican baths ===
The republican baths were entered through an atrium with a mosaic floor depicting stars and diamonds. This led to the large exedra (semicircular hall) (7) likely for changing and exercise, with the "small exedra" next to it. The oldest room of the baths was the adjacent domed round bath (4) of the 2nd century BC originally fed by hot spring water. Under Hadrian, the bath was converted into a laconicum or sudatorium (dry heat bath) by supporting a new marble floor on brick columns for heating from below.

These baths had a large additional suite of rooms which surrounded a peristyle garden (1) with octagonal columns. On the west of the peristyle are numerous rooms paved with mosaic floors for various activities such as social and business meetings and therapeutic treatments.

The caldarium was divided with two rows of travertine columns resembling a basilica, with a large central hot bath and three small bathtubs on the sides between the columns. It was fed by hot water from a sulfurous spring. Nozzles allowed excess water from the pool to flow into the bathtubs, thus keeping the water level constant. Under Hadrian, the columns were replaced and strengthened by embedded half-pillars to support a coffered and vaulted roof. Underneath the vault, a terrace with pavilion roof (some sort of walkway) was built. The room was decorated with beautiful marbles and Ionic capitals. At the end of the caldarium is an apse with a rectangular niche, almost completely restored, where there is a marble altar with a dedication in Greek to the Nymphs, put there by Alcibiades, a freedman of Hadrian. Two shelves at its sides probably supported the small columns of a votive niche holding the simulacrum of some water deities, perhaps the water nymphs, who were believed by the Romans to be the guardian spirits of underground springs.

=== Imperial baths ===
The adjacent imperial baths were even larger than the republican baths.

The large imperial calidarium (10) measured 23x9 m. A swimming pool took up most of the room and white marble slabs covered the pool and walls. A series of alternating square and semi-circular niches made the structure seem lighter and the windows in the niches let in the sunlight. The window panes were anchored to their wooden frames with molten lead. A piping system supplied the pool with thermal water at 47°C. Piers (suspensura) supported the floor of the pool, insulating it to keep the water warm. It was covered by a coffered vaulted ceiling, with stucco decorations.

At the south side was a large suite of rooms for leisure and business activities and services. Between these and the baths was a library, a room decorated with several kinds of marble and a porphyry floor. Marble columns separated niches in the walls containing shelves for the library scrolls and papers. Two side rooms were probably used as reading rooms with couches in the alcoves at the back.

There were also shops in the building.

The Hadrianic part can be identified by some characteristic decorative elements and above all by at least five individual latrines as in Hadrian's Villa, which may have been reserved for use by VIPs such as the emperor. Some can be found in the vicinity of the large calidarium and in the cryptoporticus. One is near the winter triclinium with hypocaust.
