= Oscar Lini =

Italian footballer

Personal information
- Date of birth: October 1, 1928
- Place of birth: Civitavecchia, Italy
- Date of death: July 9, 2016 (aged 87)
- Place of death: Civitavecchia, Italy
- Position: Striker

Senior career*
Years	Team	Apps	(Gls)
1948–1949	Roma	1	(0)
1953–1955	Colleferro		
- * Club domestic league appearances and goals

Oscar Lini (1 October 1928 – 9 July 2016) was an Italian professional football player.

Lini played 1 game in the Serie A for A.S. Roma. He suffered a knee injury in his debut for Roma, and left the club for Serie B's U.S. Avellino. Spells with Torres Calcio, where he scored five goals in a single Serie C match, and B.P.D. Colleferro followed. He finished his career playing amateur football with U.S. Civitavecchiese.

== See also ==
- Football in Italy
- List of football clubs in Italy
