= Lattanzi Cucina Italiana =

- Interactive map of Lattanzi Cucina Italiana

Restaurant information
- Established: 1984; 42 years ago
- Food type: Italian
- Location: 361 West 46th Street, New York City, New York, New York, 10036, United States
- Coordinates: 40°45′39″N 73°59′24″W
- Reservations: Yes
- Website: lattanzinyc.com

Lattanzi Cucina Italiana is a New York City Italian-American restaurant.

== Saturday Night Live connection ==
The New York Times reported in 2025 that "Every Tuesday evening before a new episode of 'Saturday Night Live', Lattanzi is where you’ll find Lorne Michaels, the show’s creator and kingpin, and that week’s celebrity host, along with a rotating cadre of eight or so carefully chosen 'S.N.L.' producers, writers and cast members."

== Reviews ==
USA Today wrote "Italian-sized portions will waken your appetite but not overwhelm, perfect date place with softly lit tables just distant enough to have a private conversation."
