= Pasquale Lattanzi =

Italian footballer

Personal information
- Date of birth: March 24, 1950
- Place of birth: Civitavecchia, Italy
- Date of death: July 7, 2015
- Height: 1.82 m (5 ft 11 1/2 in)
- Position: Goalkeeper

Senior career*
Years	Team	Apps	(Gls)
1966–1967	Tevere Roma		
1967–1968	Mantova	0	(0)
1968–1969	Internazionale	1	(0)
1969–1970	Udinese	5	(0)
1970–1972	Avellino	0	(0)
- * Club domestic league appearances and goals

Pasquale Lattanzi (born March 24, 1950, in Civitavecchia) was an Italian professional football player.
