= Trans-European Airport network =

The Trans-European Airport network is one of a number of the Trans-European Transport Networks (TEN-T) of the European Union.

According to Article 13 of the Decision No 1692/96/EC of the European Parliament and of the Council of 23 July 1996 on Community guidelines for the development of the trans-European transport network, the Trans-European Airport network comprises airports situated within the territory of the Community which are open to commercial air traffic.

Similarly to the seaports included in the Trans-European Transport network, the airports must correspond to one of the following three categories of connecting points:

A. International connecting points: All airports or airport systems with a total annual traffic volume of no less than:

- 5,000,000 passenger movements minus 10%, or
- 100,000 commercial aircraft movements, or
- 150,000 tonnes freight throughput, or
- 1,000,000 extra-Community passenger movements;

or

- any new airport constructed to replace an existing international connecting point which cannot be developed further on its site.

B. Community connecting points will include all airports or airport systems with an annual traffic volume of:

- between 1,000,000 minus 10% and 4,499,999 passenger movements, or
- between 50,000 and 149,999 tonnes freight throughput, or
- between 500,000 and 899,999 passenger movements, of which at least 30% are non-national, or
- between 300,000 and 899,999 passenger movements, and located off the European mainland at a distance of over 500 km from the nearest international connecting point;

or

- any new airport constructed to replace an existing Community connecting point which cannot be developed further on its site.

C. Regional connecting points and accessibility points will include all airports

- with an annual traffic volume of between 500,000 and 899,999 passenger movements, of which less than 30% are non-national, or
- with an annual traffic volume of between 250,000 minus 10% and 499,999 passenger movements, or
- with an annual traffic volume of between 10,000 and 49,999 tonnes freight throughput, or
- located on an island of a Member State, or
- located in a landlocked area of the Community with commercial services operated by aircraft with a maximum take-off weight in excess of 10 tonnes.

An airport is located in a landlocked area if it is situated outside a radius of over 100 km from the nearest International or Community connecting point. This distance may, by way of exception, be reduced to 75 km in order to take account of difficult access due to the geographical situation or the poor quality of the inland transport infrastructure.

Airports in all three categories are shown on this map (13 MB), p. 103

In addition to the above characteristics, International and Community connecting points should also be gradually linked to the Trans-European high-speed rail network, where appropriate. The network should include the infrastructures and the facilities which permit the integration of air and rail transport services and, where appropriate, maritime transport services.
