= Trans-European Combined Transport network =

The Trans-European Combined Transport network is one of a number of the Trans-European Transport Networks (TEN-T) of the European Union.

According to Article 14 of the Decision No 1692/96/EC of the European Parliament and of the Council of 23 July 1996 on Community guidelines for the development of the trans-European transport network, the Trans-European Combined Transport network comprises the following:

- Railways and inland waterways suitable for combined transport and shipping which, combined where appropriate with the shortest possible initial and/or terminal road haulage, permit the long-distance transport of goods
- Inter-modal terminals equipped with installations permitting transhipment between railways, inland waterways, shipping routes and roads
- Suitable rolling stock, on a provisional basis, where the characteristics of the infrastructure, as yet unadapted, so require.
