= Trans-European conventional rail network =

Set of international sub-250 km/h transport links

The Trans-European conventional rail network, together with the Trans-European high-speed rail network, make up the Trans-European Rail network, which in turn is one of a number of the European Union's Trans-European transport networks (TEN-T). It was defined by the Council Directive 2001/16/EC of 19 March 2001.

== Description ==
The aim of this EU Directive is to achieve the interoperability of the European conventional rail network at the various stages of its design, construction and operation.

The network is defined as a system consisting of a set of infrastructures, fixed installations, logistic equipment and rolling stock.

By definition of the EC decision, the conventional rail network may be subdivided into the following categories:

- lines intended for passenger services
- lines intended for mixed traffic (passengers and freight)
- lines specially designed or upgraded for freight services
- passenger hubs
- freight hubs, including inter-modal terminals
- lines connecting the components mentioned above

This infrastructure includes traffic management, tracking, and navigation systems.

The rolling stock may comprise all the stock likely to travel on all or part of the trans-European conventional rail network.

== Corridors ==
The EU has decided on nine "core network corridors" within the TEN-T framework, which are:

1. The Scandinavian–Mediterranean Corridor: Hamina–Helsinki–Turku, Stockholm/Oslo–Copenhagen/Rostock–Hamburg/Berlin–Kassel/Leipzig–Nuremberg-Regensburg–Munich–Innsbruck–Verona–Florence–Rome–Naples–Messina/Bari–Palermo/Taranto–Valletta
2. The North Sea–Baltic Corridor: Rotterdam–Amsterdam/Brussels–Hannover–Berlin–Warsaw–Kaunas–Riga–Tallinn
3. The North Sea–Mediterranean Corridor: Cork–Dublin–Belfast, Glasgow/Edinburgh/Holyhead–Manchester–Birmingham–London–Brussels–Luxembourg–Strasbourg/Nancy–Lyon–Marseille/Montpellier
4. The Baltic–Adriatic Corridor: Gdańsk/Szczecin–Warsaw/Poznań–Łódź/Wrocław–Katowice–Ostrava–Brno/Bratislava–Vienna–Ljubljana/Udine–Venice–Bologna–Ravenna
5. The Orient/East–Mediterranean Corridor: Hamburg/Bremen/Rostock–Hannover–Leipzig/Berlin–Dresden–Prague–Vienna/Bratislava–Budapest–Timișoara–Sofia–Burgas/Athens–Patras/Limassol–Nicosia
6. The Rhine–Alpine Corridor: Amsterdam/Rotterdam/Ostend–Düsseldorf/Brussels–Cologne–Frankfurt–Basel–Bern–Novara/Milan–Genoa
7. The Atlantic Corridor: Lisbon/Porto/Algeciras–Salamanca/Madrid–San Sebastián–Bordeaux–Paris–Le Havre/Mannheim/Strasbourg
8. The Rhine–Danube Corridor: Strasbourg–Frankfurt–Prague–Kosice/Strasbourg–Stuttgart–Munich–Vienna–Bratislava–Budapest–Timișoara–Bucharest–Constanța
9. The Mediterranean Corridor: Algeciras–Seville/Málaga–Madrid/Valencia–Barcelona–Montpellier–Lyon–Turin–Milan–Venice–Ljubljana–Zagreb–Budapest

The listed routes are approximate and there are branches on several of them.

== See also ==
- Trans-European Transport Network
- High-speed rail in Europe
- First Railway Package and Second Railway Package, related EU legislation
