= Trans-European road network =

The Trans-European road network (TERN) was defined by Council Decision 93/629/EEC of 29 October 1993, and is a project to improve the internal road infrastructure of the European Union (EU). The TERN project is one of several Trans-European Transport Networks.

Decision 93/629/EEC expired on 30 June 1995 so it was further expanded by the Decision No 1692/96/EC of the European Parliament and of the Council of 23 July 1996 on Community guidelines for the development of the trans-European transport network, which added definition not only to the proposed road network, but to other Trans-European Transport Networks (TEN-T), as they came to be called.

This Decision is no longer in force either since it was replaced by Decision No 661/2010/EU of the European Parliament and of the Council of 7 July 2010 on Union guidelines for the development of the trans-European transport network.

== Details of the road network ==
The trans-European road network, as laid out by Article 9 of Decision 661/2010/EU, is to include motorways and high-quality roads, whether existing, new or to be adapted, which:

- play an important role in long-distance traffic; or
- bypass the main urban centres on the routes identified by the network; or
- provide interconnection with other modes of transport; or
- link landlocked and peripheral regions to central regions of the Union.

Beyond these, the network should guarantee users a high, uniform and continuous level of services, comfort and safety. It has also include infrastructure for traffic management, user information, dealing with incidents and emergencies and electronic fee collection, such infrastructure being based on active cooperation between traffic management systems at European, national and regional level and providers of travel and traffic information and value added services, which will ensure the necessary complementarity with applications whose deployment is facilitated under the trans-European telecommunications networks programme.

== Selected TERN projects ==
- Øresund Bridge, Denmark & Sweden (1992–1994)
- Sidcup Bypass, London, United Kingdom (1985)
- M25 motorway upgrades, UK (1985)
- M20 motorway upgrades, UK (1986, 1989)
- E-18 (Nordic Triangle) route in Finland (1995–2001)
- A6 extensions in Germany (1997)
- A43 improvements in Maurienne, France (1998)
- A8 autobahn, Germany (2000)
- N-340 from Cádiz to Barcelona via Málaga, Spain (2001)
- A1 and A2 (east-west) motorways, Greece (1990–2004)
- Ireland-UK-Benelux Link

== Projects of common interest ==
In addition to specific priority axes and projects, projects of common interest form a common objective, the implementation of which depends on their degree of maturity and the availability of financial resources. Any project is of common interest which fulfils the criteria established in Article 7 of Decision 661/2010/EU.

== See also ==
- European routes
