= Trans-European Inland Waterway network =

The Trans-European Inland Waterway network is one of a number of the Trans-European Transport Networks (TEN-T) of the European Union.

According to Article 11 of the Decision No 1692/96/EC of the European Parliament and of the Council of 23 July 1996 on Community guidelines for the development of the Trans-European Transport Network, the Trans-European Inland waterway network is made up of rivers and canals, and the various branches and links which connect them. In particular, it should render possible the interconnection between industrial regions and major conurbations and link them to ports.

The minimum technical characteristics for waterways forming part of the network should be those laid down for a class IV waterway in the classification of European Inland Waterways (CEMT), which allows the passage of a vessel or a pushed train 80-to-85-metre-long (260 to 280 ft) and 9.50-metre-wide (31 ft). Where a waterway forming part of the network is modernized or constructed, the technical specifications should correspond at least to class IV, should enable class Va/Vb to be achieved at a later date, and should make satisfactory provision for the passage of vessels used for combined transport. Class Va allows the passage of a vessel or a pushed train of craft 110 m long and 11.40 m wide, and class Vb allows the passage of a pushed train of craft 172 to 185 m long and 11.40 m wide.

== Inland ports ==
Inland ports are part of the network, as points of interconnection between the inland waterways.

Inland ports must be:

- open to commercial traffic;
- located on the network of inland waterways as shown in the outline (13 MB), p. 79;
- interconnected with other trans-European transport routes as shown in the document above; and
- equipped with trans-shipment facilities for inter-modal transport or with an annual freight traffic volume of at least 500 000 tonnes.
