= Trans-European Seaport network =

The Trans-European Seaport network is one of a number of the Trans-European Transport Networks (TEN-T) of the European Union.

According to Article 12 of the Decision No 1692/96/EC of the European Parliament and of the Council of 23 July 1996 on Community guidelines for the development of the trans-European transport network, the Trans-European Seaport network should permit the development of sea transport, and should constitute shipping links for islands and the points of interconnection between sea transport and other modes of transport. They should also provide equipment and services to transport operators. Their infrastructure should provide a range of services for passenger and freight transport, including ferry services and short- and long-distance shipping services, which also includes coastal shipping, within the Community and between the latter and non-member countries.

The seaports included in the Trans-European Transport network must correspond to one of the following three categories:

A. International seaports: Ports with a total annual traffic volume of not less than 1.5 million tonnes of freight, or 200,000 passengers. These ports are connected with the overland elements of the Trans-European Transport network, unless that is physically impossible, and therefore play a major role in international maritime transport. Seaports in category A are shown on this map (13 MB), p. 93

B. Community seaports: These ports have a total annual traffic volume of not less than 0.5 million tonnes of freight or between 100,000 and 199,999 passengers, and are connected with the overland elements of the Trans-European Transport network, unless that is physically impossible, and are equipped with the necessary transhipment facilities for short-distance sea shipping.

C. Regional ports: These ports do not meet the criteria of categories A and B but are situated in island, peripheral or outermost regions, interconnecting such regions by sea and/or connecting them with the central regions of the Community.

== Core ports ==
List of core TEN-T ports as identified in a 2010 report financed by the Directorate-General for Mobility and Transport. Note that the list features port of non-EU member states such as Iceland, Norway and Turkey. Also, since 2020, the United Kingdom no longer forms part of the European Union.

Group	Individual port	Country	Tonnage (mill.)
Antwerp		Belgium	171
West Scheldt Group	Total	Belgium/Netherlands	103
West Scheldt Group	Gent	Belgium	27
West Scheldt Group	Oostende	Belgium	8
West Scheldt Group	Zeebrugge	Belgium	35
West Scheldt Group	Zeeland Seaports	Netherlands	33
Varna		Bulgaria	11
Limassol		Cyprus	4
Bremerhaven		Germany	75
Hamburg		Germany	119
Rostock		Germany	21
The Sound	Total	Denmark/Sweden	42
The Sound	Copenhagen/Malmö	Denmark/Sweden	18
The Sound	Helsinborg	Sweden	8
The Sound	Helsingor	Denmark	4
The Sound	Trelleborg	Sweden	12
Jutland	Total	Denmark	15
Jutland	Aarhus	Denmark	12
Jutland	Frederikshavn	Denmark	3
Tallinn		Estonia	29
Algeciras		Spain	62
Bilbao		Spain	37
Valencia		Spain	59
Barcelona		Spain	50
Helsinki		Finland	12
Nord Pas de Calais	Total	France	69
Nord Pas de Calais	Calais	France	19
Nord Pas de Calais	Dunkerque	France	50
Le Havre		France	76
Marseille		France	92
Nantes St Nazaire		France	33
Patras		Greece	4
Piraeus		Greece	9
Thessaloniki		Greece	16
Ploče		Croatia	5
Rijeka		Croatia	3
Dublin		Ireland	21
Reykjavik		Iceland	3
North West Italy	Total	Italy	62
North West Italy	Genova	Italy	46
North West Italy	Savona	Italy	16
West Italy	Total	Italy	45
West Italy	La Spezia	Italy	17
West Italy	Livorno	Italy	28
North East Italy	Total	Italy	67
North East Italy	Trieste	Italy	37
North East Italy	Venezia	Italy	30
South East Italy	Total	Italy	61
South East Italy	Brindisi	Italy	11
South East Italy	Taranto	Italy	50
Gioia Tauro		Italy	31
Campania	Total	Italy	28
Campania	Napoli	Italy	19
Campania	Salerno	Italy	9
Klaipeda		Lithuania	27
Marsaxlokk		Malta	0.8
Amsterdam		Netherlands	74
Rotterdam		Netherlands	384
Oslo		Norway	5
Wisla	Total	Poland	30
Wisla	Gdańsk	Poland	17
Wisla	Gdynia	Poland	13
Odra	Total	Poland	17
Odra	Swinoujscie	Poland	9
Odra	Szczecin	Poland	8
Oporto-Leixoes		Portugal	15
Lisboa		Portugal	12
Constanta		Romania	46
Göteborg		Sweden	42
Stockholm		Sweden	5
Koper		Slovenia	16
Ambarli/Istanbul		Turkey	27
Izmir		Turkey	11
Mersin		Turkey	18
Dover		United Kingdom	24
Felixstowe		United Kingdom	25
Forth		United Kingdom	39
Humber	Total	United Kingdom	75
Humber	Grimsby and Immimgham	United Kingdom	65
Humber	Hull	United Kingdom	10
Liverpool		United Kingdom	32
Thames/Medway	Total	United Kingdom	65
Thames/Medway	London and Immimgham	United Kingdom	52
Thames/Medway	Thamesport/Medway	United Kingdom	13
Southampton		United Kingdom	41
Tees and Hartlepool		United Kingdom	45
