= Motorways of the Sea =

Concept in EU transport policy

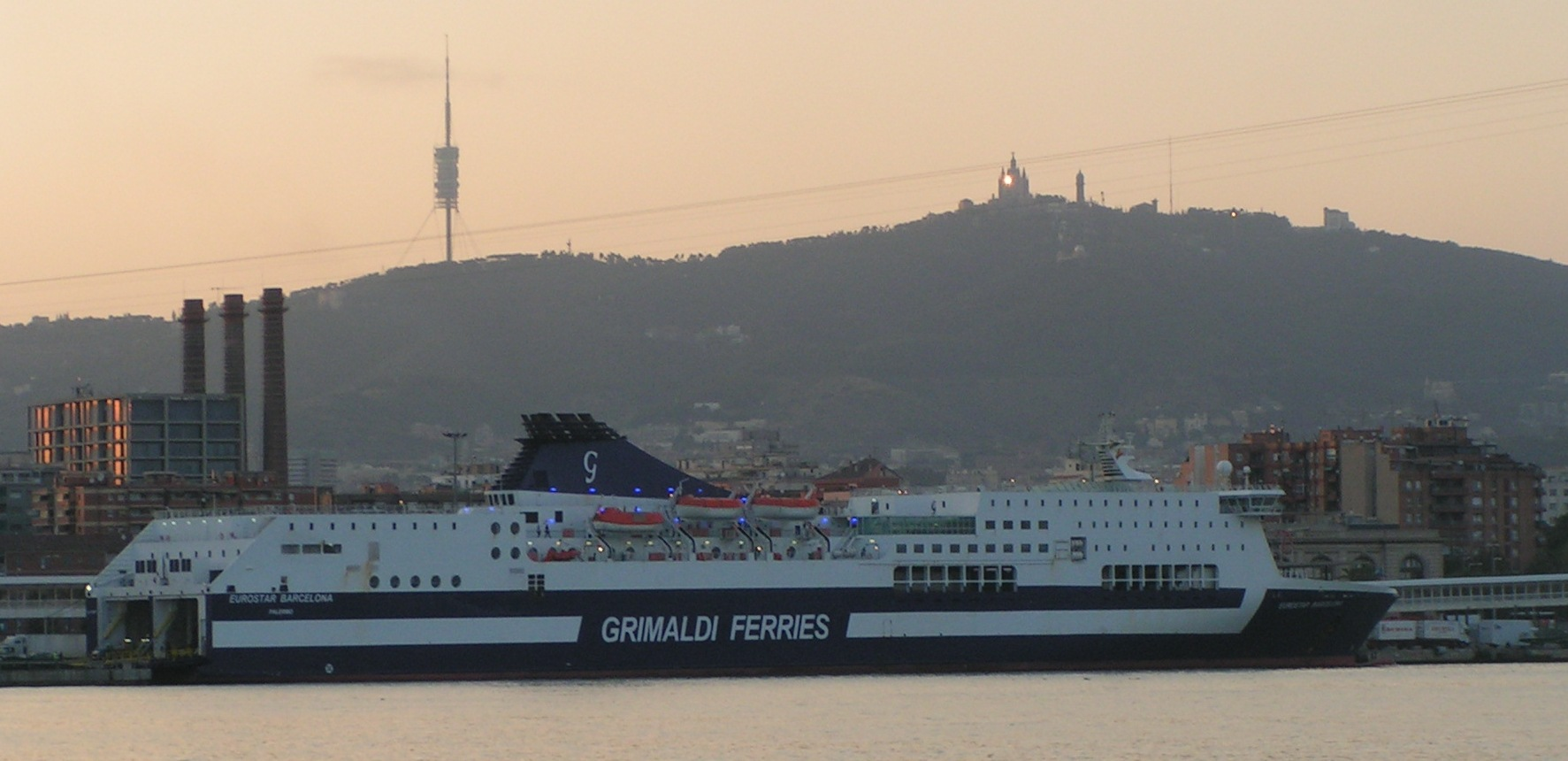
Ferry in Barcelona harbour

Motorways of the Sea is a concept in the transport policy of the European Union, stressing the importance of sea transport. The main aim of these Motorways of the Sea is to improve port communications with peripheral regions of the European continent and thus strengthen the networks between the EU candidate countries and those countries already part of the European Union.

== History ==
The concept came about in the White paper European transport policy for 2010: time to decide of the European Commission, which was adopted in June 2001 in Gothenburg, as an alternative to motorways on land.

== Routes ==
The routes selected to be Motorways of the Sea should be able to maintain a series of quality criteria; these pertain to frequency, port to port costs, simplicity of administrative tasks. Future routes should compensate for congestion experienced, for example when crossing the Channel (as the similar road networks should do for routes crossing the Alps or the Pyrenees). One envisaged impact of the Motorways of the Sea is energy savings, pollution reductions and more capacity on current overland European transport networks.

== Legal framework ==
The adoption of Article 12a of the TEN-T by Council and European Parliament gave a legal framework for funding the Motorways of the Sea, while Article 13 of the same Programme defines the characteristics of this part of the TEN-T network.

== Geographic Areas ==
Four Geographic areas have been designated by the EC (see map):

- Motorway of the Baltic Sea, linking the Baltic Sea and the North Sea-Baltic Sea canal.
- Motorway of the Sea of western Europe, from Portugal and Spain via the Atlantic Arc to the North Sea and the Irish Sea.
- Motorway of the Sea of south-east Europe, from the Adriatic Sea to the Ionian Sea and the Eastern Mediterranean, including Cyprus.
- Motorway of the Sea of south-west Europe; western Mediterranean, connecting Spain, France, Italy and including Malta and linking with the Motorway of the Sea of south-east Europe and including links to the Black Sea.
