= Basic Rail Transportation Infrastructure Index =

The Basic Rail Transportation Infrastructure Index (BRTI Index) is a synthetic measure combining rail transportation metrics (existence of modern rail networks and average speed of main inter-urban itineraries) and cost efficiency observations, used as an indicator a country's relative development in modern land transportation.

The index was first developed by World Pensions Council (WPC) financial economists within a cross-country comparative framework that included ten key jurisdictions: the UK, Canada, China, France, Germany, Italy, Russia, Turkey, the US, and Brazil.

The relative advancement of a nation's (rail) transportation infrastructure can also be measured using a more refined model called (Modified) Rail Transportation Infrastructure Index: ‘(M) RTI’ or simply ‘RTI’, whereby cost-efficiency is given more weight (x2) than average speed (x1), thus allowing for more robust cross-country comparisons
