= Political parties in Flanders =

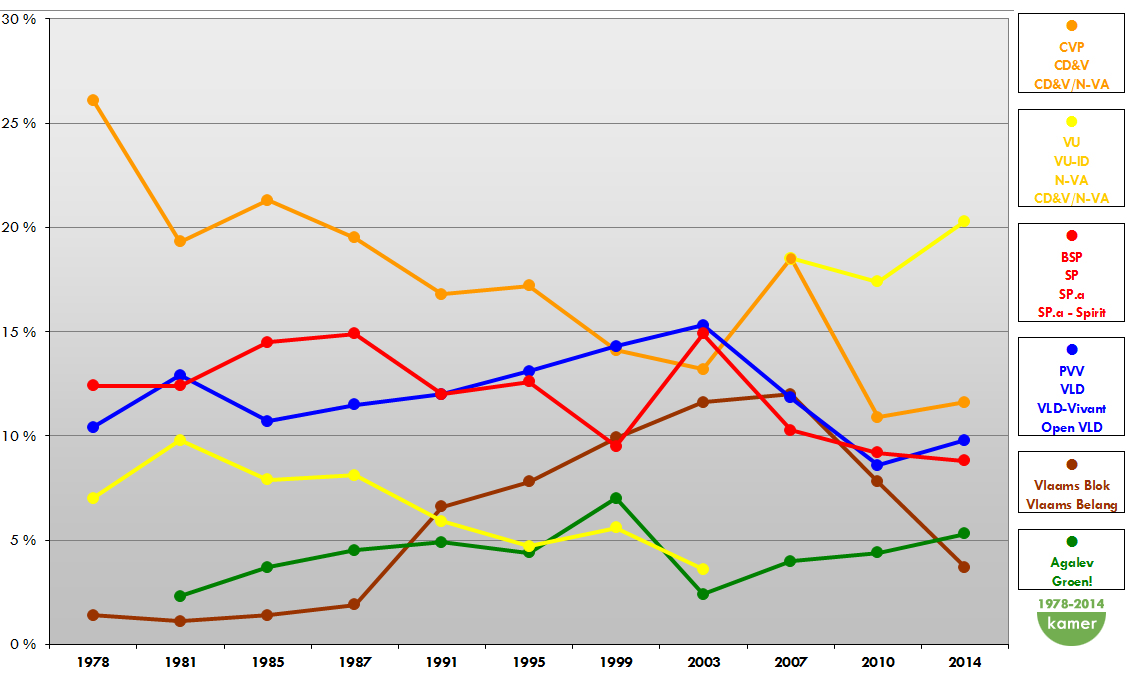
The six biggest Flemish political parties and their results for the Chamber of Representatives. From 1978 to 2014, in percentages for the complete 'Kingdom'.

Flemish political parties operate in the whole Flemish Community, which covers the unilingual Flemish Region and the bilingual Brussels-Capital Region. In the latter, they compete with French-speaking parties that all also operate in Wallonia. There are very few parties that operate on a national level in Belgium. Flanders generally tends to vote for right-wing, conservative parties, whereas in French-speaking Belgium the socialist party is usually the most successful one.

Flanders has a diverse multi-party system of politics. Many parties are active, and often none succeeds in obtaining more than one third of the votes, let alone a majority. Therefore, parties must work with each other to form coalition governments.

Most current Flemish parties grew from the main political parties that for long dominated Belgian politics: the Catholic Party (Church-oriented and conservative), the Liberal Party (anti-clerical and progressive) and the Socialist Party. These three groups still dominate Flemish politics, but they have evolved substantially in character. In the 21st century however, conservative nationalist parties such as Vlaams Blok/Belang and especially the New Flemish Alliance (N-VA) which became the largest party in 2010, were successful and broke the domination of the traditional catholic, liberal and socialist parties.

== Catholics/Christian Democrats ==
Christian Democratic and Flemish (CD&V)

The Christian-democratic party has its origins in the 19th century. in that period, it mainly competed with the liberals. They for long took turns in leading Belgian government. By the end of the 19th century, the then emerging socialist party rapidly took an important place in Belgian politics. This continued in the first half of the 20th century. In the 1930s, the Christian-democrats started feeling competition from Flemish nationalists.

After World War II, the Catholic (now Christian Democratic) Party severed its formal ties with the Church. It became a mass party of the center, somewhat like a big tent political party in the United States.

In 1978, the Christian Democratic Party, responding to linguistic tensions in the country, divided into two independent parties: the Parti Social Chrétien (PSC) in French-speaking Belgium and the Christelijke Volkspartij (CVP) in Flanders. The two parties pursue the same basic policies but maintain separate organizations. The CVP was the larger of the two, getting more than twice as many votes as the PSC.

Following the 1999 federal elections, the CVP and PSC were ousted from office, bringing an end to a 40-year term on the government benches. In 2001, the CVP changed its name to CD&V (Christen-Democratisch en Vlaams). They won again during the 2007 federal elections, cooperating with the New Flemish Alliance (N-VA). Later on, CD&V and N-VA split and CD&V reached a record low during the 2010 federal elections whereas N-VA became the biggest party.

== Socialists/Social Democrats ==
Vooruit (Forward)

The modern Socialist party have lost its original Marxist ideology. They are now social-democratic parties similar to those also affiliated to the Party of European Socialists, a European political party. The Socialists have been part of many postwar governments and have produced some of the country's most distinguished statesmen. As with the Belgian Christian Democrats, the Belgian Socialist Party also split along linguistic lines in 1978.

In the 1980s, the Flemish Socialists focused heavily on international issues, and on security in Europe in particular, where they frequently opposed U.S. policies. However, first with Willy Claes, then Frank Vandenbroucke and with Erik Derycke as Foreign Minister, the party made a significant shift to the center adopting less controversial stances on foreign policy issues.

In 2001, the Flemish Socialist Party (Socialistische Partij, SP) changed its name to Socialist Party Different (Socialistische Partij anders) and was most commonly known by the acronym SP.a. Until on 21 March 2021 when the current name Forward (Vooruit) was adopted.

== Liberals ==
Open Flemish Liberals and Democrats (Open Vld)

The Flemish Liberals and Democrats (Vlaamse Liberalen en Democraten, VLD) who opened up their ranks to Volksunie defectors during the 1990s, was successful during that period and formed governments with Guy Verhofstadt as Prime Minister. They lost again in 2007 and decreased further in the 2010 election.

The Liberals chiefly appeal to business-people, property owners, shopkeepers, and the self-employed, in general. In American terms the Liberals' economic positions would be considered to reflect a moderate conservative ideology.

Over the last decade, a number of parties originated, as break away parties from the VLD. These were Liberaal Appèl, founded by Ward Beysen, VLOTT, founded by Hugo Coveliers and Lijst Dedecker, founded by Jean-Marie Dedecker. These parties advocated classical liberal economics and a more rightwing approach to society, and accused the VLD of shifting fundamentally to the left.

== Nationalists/Conservatives/Linguistic parties ==
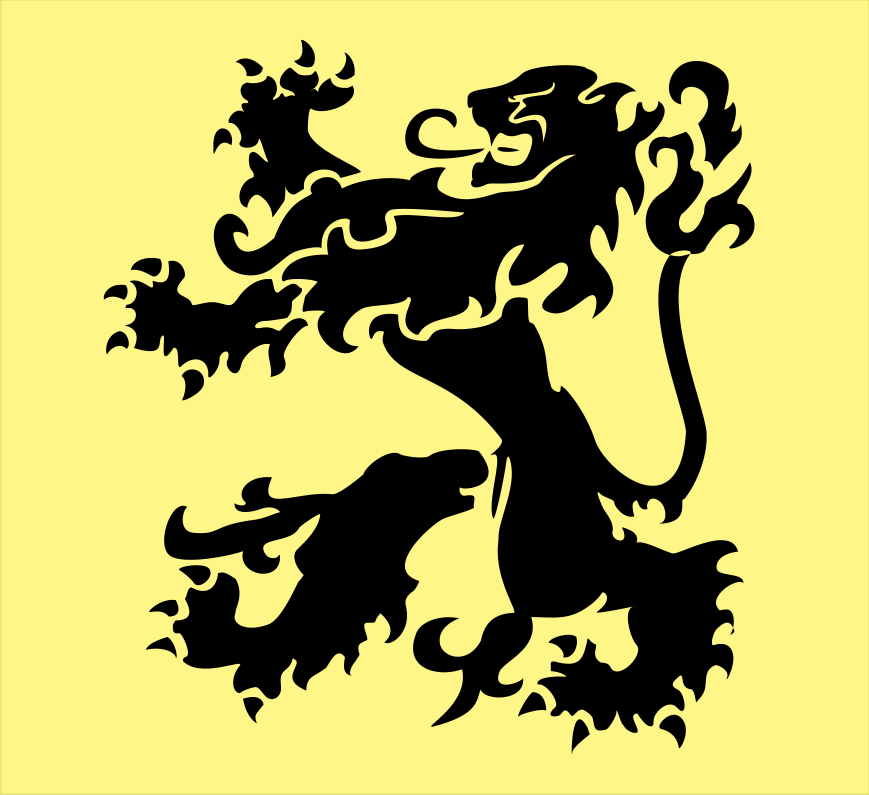
Flemish flag, as used by the Flemish Movement.

The foremost nationalist party in Flanders is the Vlaams Belang (Flemish Interest), which was founded in 2004, after its predecessor Vlaams Blok (Flemish Block) was condemned by a High Court for "permanent incitation to discrimination and racism." The Vlaams Belang is most strident in pursuing a nationalist agenda (Flemish independence).

The most militant Flemish regional party in Parliament in the 1950s and 1960s, the Volksunie (VU), once drew nearly one-quarter of Belgium's Dutch-speaking electorate away from the traditional parties. The Volksunie was in the forefront of a successful campaign by the country's Flemish population for cultural and political parity with the nation's long dominant French-speaking population. However, later on the party suffered severe setbacks and in October 2001 the party disintegrated. The social-liberal wing founded Spirit, later called the Social Liberal Party, while the more traditional Flemish nationalist wing continued under the banner New Flemish Alliance (N-VA). After a disappointing result in the regional elections of 2009, the Social Liberal Party decided to fuse with the Flemish ecologists of Groen.

In the 2010 federal elections, the New Flemish Alliance became the biggest party and broke the domination of the traditional parties.

== Ecologists/Greens ==
Green

The Flemish ecologists (Groen, previously called Agalev and Groen!) made their parliamentary breakthrough in 1981. They focus heavily on environmental issues and investing in public transport to solve mobility issues.

Their results generally remain stable, the greens were especially successful in the 1999 federal elections, after which they joined a federal coalition cabinet for the first time in their history, but were ousted after the next elections. They similarly joined Flemish governments in the 1999-2004 period.

== French-speaking minority ==
Union des Francophones

The Union des Francophones (UF) is a Belgian electoral list which participates in regional, provincial and municipal elections in the Brussels Periphery, which is the part of the province of Flemish Brabant surrounding the bilingual Brussels Region. As the name suggests, its primary target are the French-speaking inhabitants of Flemish Brabant and particularly those who live in Halle-Vilvoorde and the predominantly French-speaking municipalities with linguistic facilities near the Brussels-Capital Region. The UF is a cooperation between the three most important French-speaking parties in Belgium: the Mouvement Réformateur, the Centre Démocrate Humaniste and the Parti Socialiste. The coalition wants an enlargement of the bilingual Brussels-Capital Region through the merger of various municipalities with linguistic facilities with a large percentage of French-speakers, like Sint-Genesius-Rode, and opposed the splitting of the bilingual Brussels-Halle-Vilvoorde electoral and judicial constituency.

The party has one representative in the Flemish Parliament, five to six in the Flemish Brabant provincial council and several municipal councillors in the concerning towns.

== Communists ==
The Kommunistische Partij (KP) is the successor in Flanders of the Kommunistische Partij van België (KPB), the first communist party in Belgium. This party was founded in 1921, but disappeared out of the Belgian Parliament after the elections of 1985.

The most successful Maoist movement to emerge in Flanders was Alle Macht Aan De Arbeiders (AMADA - All Power To The Workers) at the end of the 1960s during a time of students protests at the University of Leuven. In 1979 this movement evolved into the Partij van de Arbeid van België (PVDA), which is at the moment the biggest communist party in Flanders and is represented in some municipal councils in Flanders, and in the Flemish Parliament.

Other minor communist parties are the Trotskyist Socialistische Arbeiderspartij (SAP) and the Linkse Socialistische Partij (LSP).

== Alliances ==
After the installation of a 5% electoral threshold, with private funding close to forbidden and public funding only for parties with at least one representative in parliament, some of the smaller parties have made alliances with a larger, more traditional party. Parties in any alliance remain independent, but they would field candidates on one combined list at elections. In general, the smaller party/parties would be assured of gaining seats, and the larger party would be assured of obtaining a larger overall share of the vote. This was especially true for the CD&V / N-VA alliance, whereby CD&V became the largest party by votes in the Flemish regional elections, so therefore it could initiate coalition talks and the party could appoint the leader of the Flemish regional government. The VLD / Vivant alliance did not perform well in the polls. The proposed SP.a / Spirit / Groen! alliance did not succeed, instead the SP.a / Spirit alliance went to the polls.

== Electoral results and membership ==
Vote share for the 2019 Flemish Parliament elections
▼ N-VA	24.8%
▲ Vlaams Belang	18.5%
▼CD&V	15.4%
▼ Open Vld	13.1%
▼ sp.a	10.1%
▲ Groen	10.1%
▲PVDA+	5.3%
▼UF	0.7%
Other	1.9%

CD&V had the highest number of members (followed by the other two traditional parties) from its founding until the 2010s, when its membership decreased rapidly and sunk below Open Vld.

Membership of Flemish political parties (2014)
▼ Open Vld	63,239
▼CD&V	56,746
▼ sp.a	49,703
▲ N-VA	41,176
▼ Vlaams Belang	17,255
▲ Groen	7,800

== The parties ==
=== Representative parties ===
- Christian-Democratic and Flemish (Christen-Democratisch en Vlaams, CD&V)
- Flemish Interest (Vlaams Belang, VB)
- Green (Groen)
- New Flemish Alliance (Nieuw-Vlaamse Alliantie, N-VA)
- Open Flemish Liberals and Democrats (Open Vlaamse Liberalen en Democraten, Open VLD)
- Forward (Vooruit)
- Union of Francophones (Union des Francophones, UF)
- Worker's Party of Belgium (Partij van de Arbeid van Belgiquë, PVDA)

=== Parties not represented in the Flemish Parliament ===
- Belgian Union (Belgische Unie, BUB)
- Free Flemish Christian Democrats (Vrije Vlaamse Christen Democraten, VCD)
- Left Socialist Party (Linkse Socialistische Partij, LSP)
- Libertarian, Direct, Democratic (Libertair, Direct, Democratisch, previously Lijst Dedecker, LDD)
- Pirate Party (Piratenpartij)
- Red! (Rood!)
- Socialist Workers' Party (Socialistische Arbeiders Partij, SAP)
- Vivant

== See also ==
- Political parties in Belgium
