= List of political parties in Belgium =

This article contains a list of political parties in Belgium.

Belgium is a federal state with a multi-party political system, with numerous parties who factually have no chance of gaining power alone, and therefore must work with each other to form coalition governments.

Almost all Belgian political parties are divided into linguistic groups, either Dutch-speaking parties (see also political parties in Flanders), Francophone parties or Germanophone parties.

The Flemish parties operate in Flanders and in the Brussels-Capital Region. The Francophone parties operate in Wallonia and in the Brussels-Capital Region. There are also parties operating in the comparatively small German-speaking community.

From the creation of the Belgian state in 1830 and throughout most of the 19th century, two political parties dominated Belgian politics: the Catholic Party (Church-oriented and conservative) and the Liberal Party (anti-clerical and progressive). In the late 19th century, the Labour Party arose to represent the emerging industrial working class. These three groups still dominate Belgian politics, but they have evolved substantially in character.

== Party status and financing ==
In Belgium, the status of political parties is not defined or regulated by the constitution or by laws. A party does not even need to be a formal organisation or be registered; they can exist de facto. Anyone can simply stand for elections by presenting an electoral list, provided the candidates are eligible and the list is supported by incumbent members of that body or by a certain number of voters.

Nevertheless, some aspects have been strictly regulated in the last decades. Private funding of political parties is very restricted; political parties are publicly funded based on the number of votes they received in the elections as well as for parliamentary groups (in total c. €70 million per year). Campaign expenses are regulated during a certain period preceding an election (sperperiode).

The law of 4 July 1989 on electoral expenses (for Chamber elections) and party financing uses the following definition of a political party:

The association of natural persons, either with or without legal personality, that participates in elections defined by the Constitution and by law, that, in accordance with article 117 of the Electoral Code, presents candidates for the office of representative in each electoral district of a Community or Region and that, within the limits of the Constitution, of the law, the decree and the ordinance, aims to influence the expression of the popular will in the way described in its articles or its programme.

One non-profit association (vzw/asbl) must be designated in order to receive public funding and provide accounting to an audit committee. Usually the main political parties have multiple such vzws/asbls that exist to facilitate their party structure. For example, when Vlaams Blok was taken to court for racism in 2004, the court in fact convicted three vzws, after which a successor party Vlaams Belang was founded.

Equivalent laws exist for the electoral expenses in the European Parliament elections, the regional elections and local elections.

== Main ideologies or categories ==
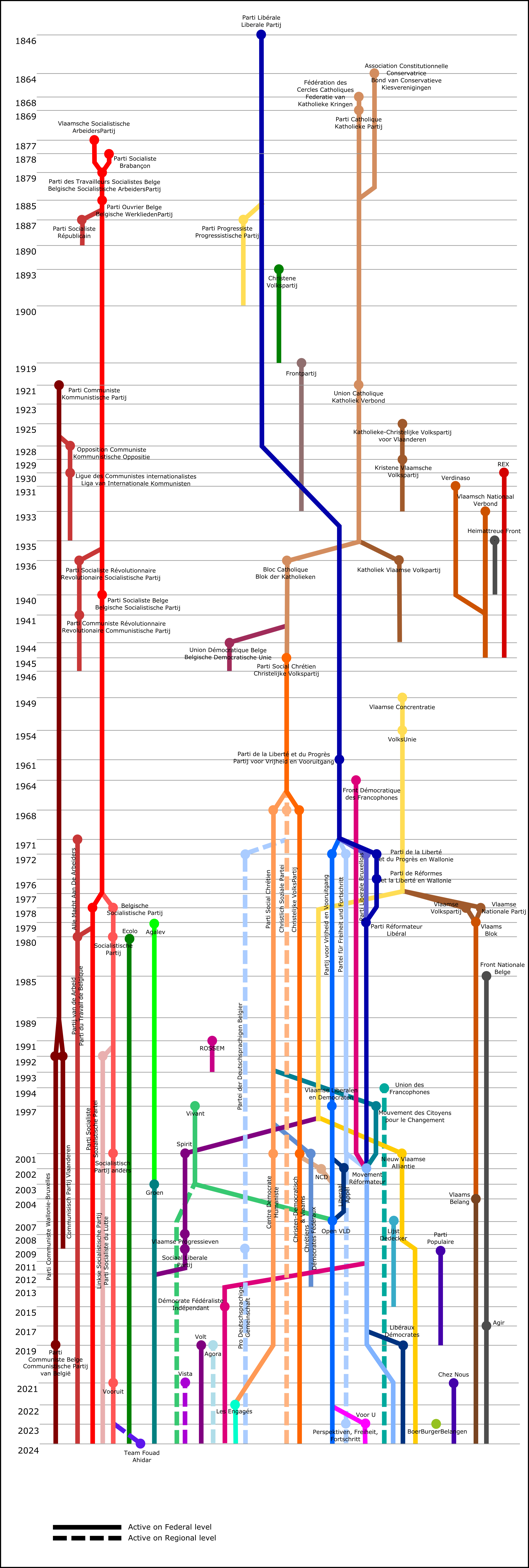
The evolution of Belgian political parties through time and political ideology.

=== Catholics/Christian Democrats ===
After World War II, the Catholic (now Christian Democratic) Party severed its formal ties with the Church. It became a mass party of the centre.

In 1968, the Christian Democratic Party, responding to linguistic tensions in the country, divided into two independent parties: the Parti Social Chrétien (PSC) in French-speaking Belgium and the Christelijke Volkspartij (CVP) in Flanders. The two parties pursue the same basic policies but maintain separate organisations. The CVP is the larger of the two, getting more than twice as many votes as the PSC. The chairman of the Flemish Catholic party is now Sammy Mahdi. Maxime Prévot is president of the Francophone Catholic party. Following the 1999 general elections, the CVP and PSC were ousted from office, bringing an end to a 40-year term on the government benches. In 2001, the CVP changed its name to Christen-Democratisch en Vlaams (CD&V). In 1971 the German wing of the PSC became independent to get the name Christlich Soziale Partei. In 2002, the PSC changed its name to Centre démocrate humaniste (cdH), and in 2022 again to Les Engagés ('The Committed Ones') abandoning their christian democratic roots.

After the big losses in the 1999 general elections, when both CVP and PSC were banished to the opposition benches, some party members decided to leave the mother parties in order to form a new liberal-conservative party. In Flanders, the New Christian Democrats (NCD) was founded by Johan Van Hecke and Karel Pinxten. In Wallonia, the Citizens' Movement for Change (MCC) was founded by Gérard Deprez. Both parties soon joined the major liberal parties, respectively the VLD in Flanders and the MR in Wallonia.

=== Socialists/Social Democrats ===
The modern Belgian Socialist parties are the descendants of the Belgian Labour Party. They have lost much of their early Marxist trends. They are now primarily labour-based parties similar to the German Social Democratic Party, the French Socialist Party, and the Dutch Labour Party. The Socialists have been part of several postwar governments and have produced some of the country's most distinguished statesmen. The Socialists also split along linguistic lines in 1978. Conner Rousseau is the current head of the Flemish Socialist Party and Paul Magnette is the current president of the Francophone Socialists. In general, the Walloon Socialists tend to concentrate on domestic issues. In the 1980s, the Flemish Socialists focused heavily on international issues, and on security in Europe in particular, where they frequently opposed U.S. policies. However, first with Willy Claes, then Frank Vandenbroucke and with Erik Derycke as Foreign Minister, all three Flemish Socialists, the party made a significant shift to the centre adopting less controversial stances on foreign policy issues.

The Francophone Parti Socialiste (PS) is mainly based in the industrial cities of Wallonia (Liège, Charleroi, and Mons). The Flemish Socialists' support is less regionally concentrated. PS is known in East Belgium as Sozialistische Partei (SP). The Flemish Socialists changed their party's name to Socialistische Partij Anders (SP.a) in 2002 and to Vooruit in 2021.

Recently, because of grassroots allegations about the party's "too little Socialist stand" in many political issues, a radical party wing broke away from the motherparty and formed, with support from smaller leftist parties, the Committee for Another Policy (CAP). Within the SP.a, the more Marxist SP.a-Rood, is trying to change the course of the party.

=== Liberals ===
The Liberal Parties chiefly appeal to businesspeople, property owners, shopkeepers, and the self-employed, in general. In the terms generally used in English-speaking countries, Belgian liberals would be called "moderate conservatives", "fiscal conservatives" and "social liberals".

There are two Liberal parties, formed along linguistic lines: The Open Vlaamse Liberalen en Democraten (Open VLD) who opened up their ranks to Volksunie and CD&V defectors some years ago, managed to break the dominance of CD&V over Belgian politics in 1999. Open VLD is currently headed by Eva De Bleeker. The Mouvement Réformateur (MR) is the equivalent party on the Francophone side, and is headed by Georges-Louis Bouchez. The MR is a federation mainly composed of the former PRL, it is also composed of the Germanophone Partei für Freiheit und Fortschritt (PFF), and is eventually also composed of the Christian-democratic split-off called MCC. It used to be composed of the Brussels-based FDF until September 2012, which is now an independent party.

Recently, the Flemish liberal party faced several high-ranking elected officials breaking away in order to found new "right-liberal" parties: MEP Ward Beysen (Liberaal Appèl, LA), senator Leo Goovaerts (Veilig Blauw), senator Hugo Coveliers (VLOTT), chief of the High Supervisory Committee Willy Vermeulen (Verstandig Rechts), VLD board member Boudewijn Bouckaert (Cassandra vzw) and senator Jean-Marie Dedecker (Lijst Dedecker, LDD). There has been also francophone "right-liberal" parties: senator Alain Destexhe (Listes Destexhe) and former Deputy Head of the Cabinet of Serge Kubla (first Libéral Démocrate, LiDé and later co-founded Parti populaire, PP).

=== Communists ===
The first communist party in Belgium was founded by the more radical elements of the Belgian Labour Party in 1921 and was named the Communist Party of Belgium (KPB-PCB). The party was a member of the Comintern and entered parliament in 1925. It received its highest score in the post-war elections of 1946, when it won 12.7% of the popular vote and took part in the next coalition government. With the start of the Cold War the party started its decline and after the elections of 1985 it was no longer represented in the Belgian Parliament. The party eventually disbanded itself in 1989, but two minor parties, the Kommunistische Partij (KP) in Flanders and the Parti Communiste (PC) in Wallonia, see themselves as the successors.

The most successful Maoist movement to emerge in Belgium was All Power To The Workers (AMADA-TPO) at the end of the 1960s during a time of students protests at the University of Leuven. In 1979 this movement evolved into the Workers' Party of Belgium (PVDA-PTB), which is currently the largest communist party in Belgium and is represented in various municipal and provincial councils, as well as in the Chamber of Representatives, in the Flemish Parliament, in the Walloon Parliament and in the Brussels Parliament.

Other minor communist and far-left parties include: the Trotskyist Revolutionary Communist League (LCR-SAP) and the Left Socialist Party (LSP-PSL).

=== Regionalist parties ===
A specific phenomenon in Belgium was the emergence of one-issue parties whose only reason for existence was the defence of the cultural, political, and economic interests of one of the linguistic groups or regions of Belgian society. See Flemish movement.

The most militant Flemish regional party in Parliament in the 1950s and 1960s, the Volksunie (VU), once drew nearly one-quarter of Belgium's Dutch-speaking electorate away from the traditional parties. The Volksunie was in the forefront of a successful campaign by the country's Flemish population for cultural and political parity with the nation's long dominant French-speaking population. However, in the nineties, the party has suffered severe setbacks. In October 2001, the party disintegrated. The left-liberal wing founded Spirit, later called the Social Liberal Party, while the more traditional Flemish nationalist wing continued under the banner Nieuw-Vlaamse Alliantie (N-VA). After a disappointing result in the regional elections of 2009, the Social Liberal Party decided to merge with the Flemish ecologists of Groen!. The N-VA, on the other hand, formed an electoral alliance with Christian-democratic CD&V from 2004 to 2008. After this period, the party's popularity grew significantly and it became the largest Flemish party. N-VA won the 2010 federal elections with 28% of the Flemish votes (17.4% of overall vote) and the 2014 Flemish parliament election with 31.9% of votes. The N-VA is led by Bart De Wever who has been mayor of Antwerp since 2013. N-VA member Geert Bourgeois has been minister-president of the Flemish government from 2014 to 2019. N-VA policies are primarily focused on economic reform through extended devolution of political power within the Belgian confederation model of governance, and do eventually propose full secession from the Belgian confederation.

Democratic, Federalist, Independent (DéFI) is a Brussels French-speaking Belgian political party that aims to defend and expand linguistic rights of French-speaking people in and around Brussels. It has been affiliated with the Mouvement Réformateur, a liberal alliance party, under the name FDF.

The Union des Francophones (UF) is an electoral list combining the major Belgian Francophone parties for the regional elections in Flanders.

The German-speaking Pro deutschsprachige Gemeinschaft (ProDG) is the successor of the hard-line Partei der Deutschsprachigen Belgier (PDB). PDB itself split from the Christian-democratic CSP and was a member of European Free Alliance and Federal Union of European Nationalities (ProDG is still member of the latter).

=== Greens ===
The Flemish (Agalev) and Francophone (Ecolo) ecologist parties made their parliamentary breakthrough in 1981. They focus heavily on environmental issues and are the most consistent critics of U.S. policy. Following significant gains made in the 1999 general elections, the two green parties joined a federal coalition cabinet for the first time in their history, but were ousted after the next elections. Agalev subsequently changed its name to Groen! in 2003. In 2012, the party dropped its trademark exclamation point and went on as Groen.

=== Nationalists ===
The foremost Flemish party in Belgium is the Vlaams Belang, which was founded in 2004, after its predecessor was condemned by a High Court for "permanent incitation to discrimination and racism." On the far right, the Flanders separatist party Vlaams Blok steadily rose in the 1980s and 1990s. The other parties except the fortuynist party VLOTT maintain a cordon sanitaire on the Vlaams Belang as they did the Vlaams Blok. Although other parties in Belgium are supportive of Flemish and Dutch cultural issues, the Vlaams Belang is most strident in pursuing a secessionist agenda, for Flemish independence.

In Wallonia, the Front National (FN) was the largest anti-immigrant Wallonian party. Officially, it was a bilingual party, but in reality, it was a purely French-speaking group, although it did support Belgian federalism.

== Alliances ==
After the installation of a 5% electoral threshold, with private funding close to forbidden and public funding only for parties with at least one representative in parliament, some of the smaller parties have made alliances with a larger, more traditional party, especially in the Flemish Region. Parties in any alliance remain independent, but they would field candidates on one combined list at elections. In general,the smaller party/parties would be assured of gaining seats, and the larger party would be assured of obtaining a larger overall share of the vote. This was especially true for the CD&V/N-VA alliance, whereby CD&V became the largest party by votes in the Flemish regional elections, so therefore it could initiate coalition talks and the party could appoint the leader of the Flemish regional government. The VLD/Vivant alliance did not perform well in the polls. The proposed SP.a/Spirit/Groen! alliance did not happen, instead the SP.a/Spirit alliance went to the polls, although the tripartite cartel became reality in some constituencies on the local level in the October 2006 municipal elections.

== Political parties ==
=== Flemish parties ===
Party		Ideology	Position	Leader	Representatives	Flemish MPs	Flemish MEPs
N-VA	New Flemish Alliance; Nieuw-Vlaamse Alliantie	Flemish nationalism	Centre-right to right-wing	Valerie Van Peel	24 / 150	31 / 124	3 / 12
VB	Flemish Interest; Vlaams Belang	Right-wing populism; Flemish nationalism	Right-wing to far-right	Tom Van Grieken	20 / 150	31 / 124	3 / 12
CD&V	Christian Democratic and Flemish; Christen-Democratisch en Vlaams	Christian democracy	Centre to centre-right	Sammy Mahdi	11 / 150	16 / 124	2 / 12
Anders	Different; Anders	Liberalism	Centre-right	Frédéric De Gucht	7 / 150	9 / 124	1 / 12
Groen	Green; Groen	Green politics	Left-wing	Aimen Horch	6 / 150	9 / 124	1 / 12
Vooruit	Forward; Vooruit	Social democracy	Centre-left	Conner Rousseau	13 / 150	18 / 124	2 / 12

=== Francophone parties ===
Party		Ideology	Position	Leader	Representatives	Walloon MPs	Walloon MEPs
PS	Socialist Party; Parti socialiste	Social democracy	Centre-left to left-wing	Paul Magnette	16 / 150	19 / 75	2 / 8
MR	Reformist Movement; Mouvement réformateur	Liberalism	Right-wing	Georges-Louis Bouchez	20 / 150	26 / 75	3 / 8
Ecolo	Ecolo	Green politics	Left-wing	Gilles Vanden Burre; Samuel Cogolati	3 / 150	5 / 75	1 / 8
LE	The Committed Ones; Les Engagés	Social liberalism	Centre to centre-right	Yvan Verougstraete	14 / 150	17 / 75	1 / 8
DéFI	DéFI	Regionalism	Centre	Sophie Rohonyi	1 / 150	0 / 75	0 / 8

=== Bilingual parties ===
Party		Ideology	Position	Leader	Representatives	Flemish MPs	Walloon MPs	MEPs
PVDA–PTB	Workers' Party of Belgium; Partij van de Arbeid van België; Parti du Travail de Belgique	Marxism	Left-wing to far-left	Raoul Hedebouw	15 / 150	9 / 124	8 / 75	1 / 21

=== German-speaking parties ===
Party		Ideology	Position	Parliamentary leader	PDG MPs	Community MEPs	National affiliation
ProDG	ProDG	Regionalism	Centre to centre-right	Clemens Scholzen	8 / 25	0 / 1	—N/a
CSP	Christian Social Party; Christlich Soziale Partei	Christian democracy	Centre to centre-right	Luc Frank	5 / 25	1 / 1	LE
SP	Socialist Party; Sozialistische Partei	Social democracy	Centre-left to left-wing	Charles Servaty	3 / 25	0 / 1	PS
Vivant	Vivant	Social liberalism	Centre-left	Roland Duchâtelet	4 / 25	0 / 1	—N/a
Ecolo	Ecolo	Green politics	Centre-left to left-wing	Freddy Mockel	2 / 25	0 / 1	Ecolo
PFF	Perspectives. Freedom. Progress. Perspektiven. Freiheit. Fortschritt.	Liberalism	Centre to centre-right	Kattrin Jadin	3 / 25	0 / 1	MR

=== Minor parties ===
==== Flemish ====
- Farmer Citizen Interests (BoerBurgerBelangen)
- For You (Voor U)
- VLOTT
- VolksLiga - Libertarian party

==== Francophone ====
- Liberal Democrats (LiDem) (former Listes Destexhe)
- Collectif Citoyen

==== Bilingual/Unionist ====
- Piratenpartij - Parti pirate
- DierAnimal (Party for the animals)
- Be.One (immigrant rights)
- Communistische Partij van België (PCB) (Communist Party of Belgium)
- Agora
- Belgische Unie - Union Belge (BUB) (Belgian Union)
- Pro Bruxsel
- European Federalist Party
- Comité voor een Andere Politiek - Comité pour une Autre Politique (CAP) (Committee for Another Policy)
- Internationale Arbeidersliga - Ligue Internationale des Travailleurs (International Workers' League)
- Ligue communiste révolutionnaire - Socialistische Arbeiderspartij/LCR-SAP (Revolutionary Communist League)
- Revolutionaire Communistische Organisatie - Organisation Communiste Révolutionnaire
- Volt Belgique - België - Belgien (Belgian section of Volt Europa)
- l'Unie (Unitaire)
- Tous Réunis pour l'Union des Mouvements Populistes (TRUMP) (All United for the Union of Populist Movements)

== Historical parties ==
- Anderz
- Agir - Walloon far right party (1989–1997)
- Catholic Party (1869–1945)
- Chez Nous (2021–2025)
- Christian Social Party (1945–1968)
- Communist Party of Belgium (1921–1989)
- Communist Party of Belgium (1963–1976)
- Frontpartij (1919–1933)
- Rexist Party - Walloon far right party (1935–1945)
- Rood! (Red!, socialist party)
- ROSSEM
- Catholic Flemish People's Party (1936–1945)
- Libertair, Direct, Democratisch/LDD (Libertarian, Direct, Democratic)
- Parti Communautaire National-Européen
- Party of New Forces - Walloon far right party (1975–1991)
- Force Nationale - Walloon far right party
- Front Nouveau de Belgique - Walloon far right party
- Rassemblement Wallonie-France
- Rassemblement Wallon
- Vlaamsch Nationaal Verbond - Flemish far right party (1933–1944)

== See also ==
- Political parties in Flanders
- List of political parties by country
- Liberalism in Belgium
- Pillarisation
- Politics of Belgium
- Politics of Flanders
- Politics of Wallonia
