= Politics of Flanders =

Politics in a region of Belgium

Flag of Flanders

Flanders is both a cultural community and an economic region within the Belgian state, and has significant autonomy.

Historically, the contemporary Flemish community (or nation, as some Flemings see it) grew out of the Catholic southern part of the medieval XVII provinces of the Low Countries. The contemporary Belgian Flanders area was divided within several feudal states. The most important states were the County of Flanders (except for its southernmost areas), the southern part of the Duchy of Brabant (except for the area around Nivelles) and the northern part of the Bishopric of Liège. Most of these states were united from 1384 to 1530 under the Burgundian Netherlands.

Between 1945 and 1973, Flanders and the greater Belgium experienced both economic and political changes; "Flanders especially benefited from this time of explosive growth, though they still had greater numbers of unemployed than ... Wallonia...."

Today, the Flemish community has a significant amount of political autonomy. Its institutions include the Flemish Parliament and a Flemish Government, both institutions of the region and community, with legislative powers for most matters and prescribed by the Belgian constitution. Residual powers rest with the federal layer, the Belgian Parliament and Government, or on the European layer (European Union).

In the 21st century, there was greater tension among the constituent linguistic parts of Belgium.

== Political system ==
Flanders is a part of the Belgian federal parliamentary representative democratic monarchy, which itself is part of the European Union. The political system in Flanders has an executive branch, the Flemish Government and a representative branch, the Flemish Parliament. The King of the Belgians, is the Head of State. The Minister-President of Flanders is the head of government. Flanders has a rather fragmented pluriform multi-party system. Politics is influenced by lobby groups, such as trade unions; mutual health insurance organizations and business interests in the form of the VOKA, UNIZO and some other employer's federations.

=== Institutional framework ===
European Union legislation and the Belgian constitution form the major elements of the wider institutional environment. European Union legislation is said to currently define the scope and limits for 70% of new legislation. The EU is headquartered in the multi-lingual city of Brussels and country of Belgium for good reasons.

The Belgian constitution establishes the framework for the autonomy in both community and regional affairs. The two relevant Flemish parliamentary assemblies then immediately decided that the Flemish Community was to absorb all the competencies of the Flemish Region. Since then, the region has no 'distinctive' parliament, nor government. European Union law, Flemish legislation and the Belgian constitution thus form the primary source of law and the basis of the political system in Flanders.

=== Flemish Government ===
The executive branch of government consists of a limited number of ministers drawn from the political parties which, in practice, form the government coalition. The ministers are appointed by the Flemish Parliament. The Cabinet is chaired by the Flemish Minister-President. Ministers head executive departments of the government. Ministers must defend their policies and performance, in person, before the Chamber. The Flemish Government must receive and keep the confidence of the Flemish Parliament.

=== Provincial and local government ===
Flanders is divided into 5 provinces, plus the local Flemish institutions in Brussels (the 'Vlaamse Gemeenschaps-Commissie' (VGC), and around 300 municipalities. Provincial and local government are an exclusive competency of the regions. The provincial governments are primarily administrative units, and are politically weak. A governor is appointed by Flemish government, and approved by the Flemish parliament. One governor presides over each province. The governor is supported by an elected Provincial Council.

Municipal governments, on the other hand, are important political entities with significant powers, and a history of independence dating from medieval times. Many national politicians have a political base in a municipality, often doubling as mayor or alderman in their own hometowns.

=== Electoral system ===
Several months before an election, each party forms a list of candidates for each district. Parties are allowed to place as many candidates on their "ticket" as there are seats available. The formation of the list is an internal process that varies with each party. The place on the list influences the election of a candidate, but its influence has diminished since the last electoral reform. Individual votes will get priority.

Political campaigns are relatively short, and there are restrictions on the use of billboards. For all of their activities, campaigns included, political parties have to rely on government subsidies and dues paid by their members. An 'electoral expenditure' law restricts expenditure of political parties during an electoral campaign. Because of the huge public bureaucracy, the high politicisation of nominations, and the widely accepted practice that political nominees spend many man-hours paid for by all tax-payers for partisan electioneering, this arrangement favours the ruling political parties. Since no single party holds an absolute majority, the strongest party or party family will usually create a coalition with other parties to form the government.

Elections for the Flemish Parliament are normally held every five years. The elections coincide with those for the European Parliament. Voting is compulsory for the Flemish and European elections. Elections for municipal and provincial councils are held every six years. Voting is not compulsory for these local elections.

== Political parties in Flanders ==
Flemish Parliament 2014–2019 New Flemish Alliance (N-VA) (43) Christian Democratic and Flemish (CD&V) (27) Open Flemish Liberals and Democrats (Open Vld) (19) Socialist Party Differently (sp.a) (18) Green (Groen) (10) Flemish Interest (Vlaams Belang) (6) Union of Francophones (UF) (1)

Flemish political parties are many and varied. They operate in the Flemish region and in the bilingual Brussels-Capital Region. Francophone parties operate in Flemish Region only in a few areas bordering the latter. Only PTB-PVDA operates all over Belgium. Flemish politics is dominated by political parties representing the different ideologies that can be found everywhere in Flanders. There are no political parties specific for certain sub-regions.

From the creation of the Belgian state in 1830, and throughout most of the 19th century, two unified political parties dominated Belgian politics: the Catholic Party (Church-oriented and conservative) and the Liberal Party (anti-clerical and progressive). In the late 19th century the Socialist Party arose to represent the emerging industrial working class.

These three groups still dominate Belgian politics, but they have evolved substantially in character. In addition, several other parties were founded, notably the Vlaams Belang, a right wing, anti-immigration and Flemish nationalistic party and currently the second most important party in Flanders, Volksunie, which split into the left-liberal SPIRIT and the right-conservative N-VA, for moderate Flemish nationalists, and Agalev, currently called Groen! for the Greens.

=== Catholics/Christian Democrats ===
After World War II, the Catholic (now Christian Democratic) Party severed its formal ties with the Church. It became a mass party of the centre.

In 1968, the Christian Democratic Party, responding to linguistic tensions in the country, divided into two independent parties: the Parti Social Chrétien (PSC) in French-speaking Belgium and the Christelijke Volkspartij (CVP) in Flanders. The two parties pursue the same basic policies but have wholly separate organizations.

The CVP is the larger of the two, getting more than twice as many votes as the PSC. Following the 1999 general elections, the CVP was ousted from office, bringing an end to a 40-year term on the government benches. In 2001, the CVP changed its name to CD&V (Christen-Democratisch en Vlaams). The current chairman of the CD&V is Sammy Mahdi.

=== Socialists/Social Democrats ===
The Socialist Party – Differently (SP.a, Socialistische Partij Anders) has shed nearly all of its early Marxist ideology. It is now primarily a social democratic party, similar to labor-based parties like the German Social Democratic Party. The Socialists have been part of several postwar governments.

It was formerly known as the Socialistische Partij (SP), which in turn had branched off from the Belgische Socialistische Partij (BSP), formed by former members of the Belgische Werklieden Partij (BWP). The Socialists split along linguistic lines in 1978. The Flemish Socialists changed their party's name to SP.a (Socialistische Partij Anders) in 2002.

As a reaction to the more centrist course of the SP.a, two former SP.a-representatives, Jef Sleeckx and Lode Van Outrive, formed, together with communist and Trotskyist activists, a new socialist movement in 2006, the Committee for Another Policy.

=== Liberals/Liberal Democrats ===
The Liberal Party chiefly appeals to business-people, property owners, shopkeepers, and the self-employed, in general. In American terms the Liberals' economic positions would be considered to reflect a moderate conservative ideology.

The Open Flemish Liberals and Democrats (OpenVLD, Open Vlaamse Liberalen en Democraten), who opened up their ranks to Volksunie defectors some years ago, were the largest political force in Flanders during the 1990s, but lost more than one third of their support after 7 years of liberal control of the post of prime minister by Guy Verhofstadt.

Over the last decade, a number of parties originated, as break away parties from the VLD. These were Liberaal Appèl, founded by Ward Beysen, VLOTT, founded by Hugo Coveliers and Lijst Dedecker, founded by Jean-Marie Dedecker. These parties advocated classical liberal economics and a more rightwing approach to society, and accused the VLD of shifting fundamentally to the left.

=== Communists ===
The Kommunistische Partij (KP) is the successor in Flanders of the Kommunistische Partij van België (KPB), the first communist party in Belgium. This party was founded in 1921, but disappeared from the Belgian Parliament after the elections of 1985.

The most successful Maoist movement to emerge in Flanders was Alle Macht Aan De Arbeiders (AMADA - All Power To The Workers) at the end of the 1960s during a time of students protests at the University of Leuven. In 1979 this movement evolved into the Partij van de Arbeid van België (PVDA), which is at the moment the biggest marxist party in Flanders.

Other minor communist parties are the Trotskyist Socialistische Arbeiderspartij (SAP) and the Linkse Socialistische Partij (LSP).

=== Linguistic parties ===
A specific phenomenon was the emergence of one-issue parties whose only reason for existence was the defense of the cultural, political, and economic interests of one of the linguistic groups or regions of Belgian society. See Flemish movement.

The most militant Flemish regional party in Parliament in the 1950s and 1960s, the Volksunie (People's Union), once drew nearly one-quarter of Belgium's Dutch-speaking electorate. It was in the forefront of a successful campaign by the country's Flemish population for cultural and political parity with the nation's long dominant French-speaking population. However, the party has suffered severe setbacks. In October 2001 the party disintegrated. The left-liberal wing founded Spirit, later called the Social Liberal Party, while the more traditional Flemish nationalist wing continued under the banner Nieuw-Vlaamse Alliantie (N-VA). After a disappointing result in the regional elections of 2009, the Social Liberal Party decided to fuse with the Flemish ecologists of Groen!

The Vlaams Blok was another party created out of the Volksunie in 1978. In 2004 it disbanded and reformed as Vlaams Belang after a conviction for violating the Anti-Racism Law. It strongly advocated Flemish independence and the cultural assimilation of migrants.

=== Ecologists/Greens ===
The Flemish ecologist party Agalev (Anders GAan LEVen - To Start Living Differently) made its parliamentary breakthrough in 1981. As a traditional green party, the three core values of Agalev were ecology, peace and participatory democracy. Following significant gains made in the 1999 general elections, the green parties of both regions joined a federal coalition cabinet for the first time in their history, but were ousted after the next elections. Agalev subsequently changed its name to Groen! (Green!).

=== Nationalists/Conservatives ===
Another nationalist party is the rightwing nationalist Vlaams Belang (Flemish Interest), the successor of the Vlaams Blok (Flemish Block) which broke away from the Volksunie in 1976. Originally a mainly Flemish regionalist and republican party, the Vlaams Blok soon concentrated on anti-immigration themes, and was often accused of xenophobia and racism. Its viewpoints on ethical and moral issues is very conservative. Party chairperson was MEP Frank Vanhecke, but Filip Dewinter is considered by many to have been the party's real leader. Long dismissed as a "fringe" party by mainstream politicians, the Flemish Block shocked observers when in the 1991 elections it posted a relatively high percentage of votes in much of Flanders, especially in Antwerp. The party scored even better in later local, regional and federal elections and still seemed to be winning support in November 2006, but the party lost a seat in the federal elections in 2007.

The Vlaams Blok was found to be operating contrary to the Belgian constitution for racism. In 2004, the Belgian Supreme Court upheld a decision of the Appeal Court of Ghent ruling that three organizations associated with the Vlaams Blok were in contempt of the 1981 Belgian law on racism and xenophobia, and that the party pursued permanent incitement to discrimination and racial segregation. The party was denied state funding and was therefore disbanded. Vlaams Blok supporters saw the conviction as a politically motivated action, and point out that the constitution had to be changed to allow for the conviction. A new party (basically the same in organization, membership, initials, and party programme, excluding anything that could be seen as racist) was founded and labelled Vlaams Belang (Flemish Interest).

=== Linguistic minority ===
The Union des Francophones (French: Union of Francophones) or UF is a Belgian electoral list which participates in regional, provincial and municipal elections in the province of Flemish Brabant. As the name suggests, its primary target are the French-speaking inhabitants of Flemish Brabant and particularly those who live in Halle-Vilvoorde and the predominantly French-speaking municipalities with linguistic facilities near the Brussels-Capital Region. The UF is a cooperation between the three most important French-speaking parties in Belgium: the Mouvement Réformateur, the Centre Démocrate Humaniste and the Parti Socialiste. The coalition wants an enlargement of the bilingual Brussels Capital Region through the merger of various municipalities with linguistic facilities with a large percentage of French-speakers, like Sint-Genesius-Rode, and opposes the splitting of the bilingual Brussels-Halle-Vilvoorde electoral and judicial constituency.

== Alliances ==
After the installation of a 5% electoral threshold, with private funding close to forbidden and public funding practically impossible (only for parties with at least one representative in parliament), some of the smaller parties have made alliances with a larger, more traditional party, especially in the Flemish Region. Parties in any alliance remain independent, but they would field candidates on one combined list at elections. In general, the smaller party/parties would be assured of gaining seats, and the larger party would be assured of obtaining a larger overall share of the vote. This was especially true for the CD&V / N-VA alliance, whereby CD&V became the largest party by votes in the Flemish regional elections, so therefore it could initiate coalition talks and the party could appoint the leader of the Flemish regional government.

The VLD / Vivant / Liberaal Appel alliance did not perform well in the polls. The alliance was renamed Open VLD as of February 2007. The SP.a / Spirit alliance went also to the polls. Vlaams Belang formed an alliance with VLOTT, a break away party from the VLD, which advocates capitalist and rightwing liberal economic policies.

In 2024, it took the entire summer to create a Coalition government for Flanders.

== The parties ==
=== Representative political parties ===
Following parties have consistent presence in the Flemish parliament:

- Christian-Democratic and Flemish (Christen-Democratisch en Vlaams)
- Flemish Interest (Vlaams Belang)
- Open Flemish Liberals and Democrats (Open Vlaamse Liberalen en Democraten)
- Green (Groen)
- List Dedecker (Lijst Dedecker)
- New-Flemish Alliance (Nieuw-Vlaamse Alliantie)
- Forward (Vooruit)

=== Parties without representation in the Flemish Parliament ===
- Belgische Unie/Union Belge (Belgian Union)
- Committee for Another Policy (Comité voor een Andere Politiek)
- Left Socialist Party (Linkse Socialistische Partij)
- Liberaal Appèl (Liberal Appeal)
- Vivant—part of the alliance VLD/VIVANT
- VLOTT—part of the alliance VB/VLOTT

== See also ==
- Politics of Belgium, Politics of Brussels, Politics of Wallonia
- Greater Netherlands
