= 2006 Belgian local elections =

- 8 October 2006
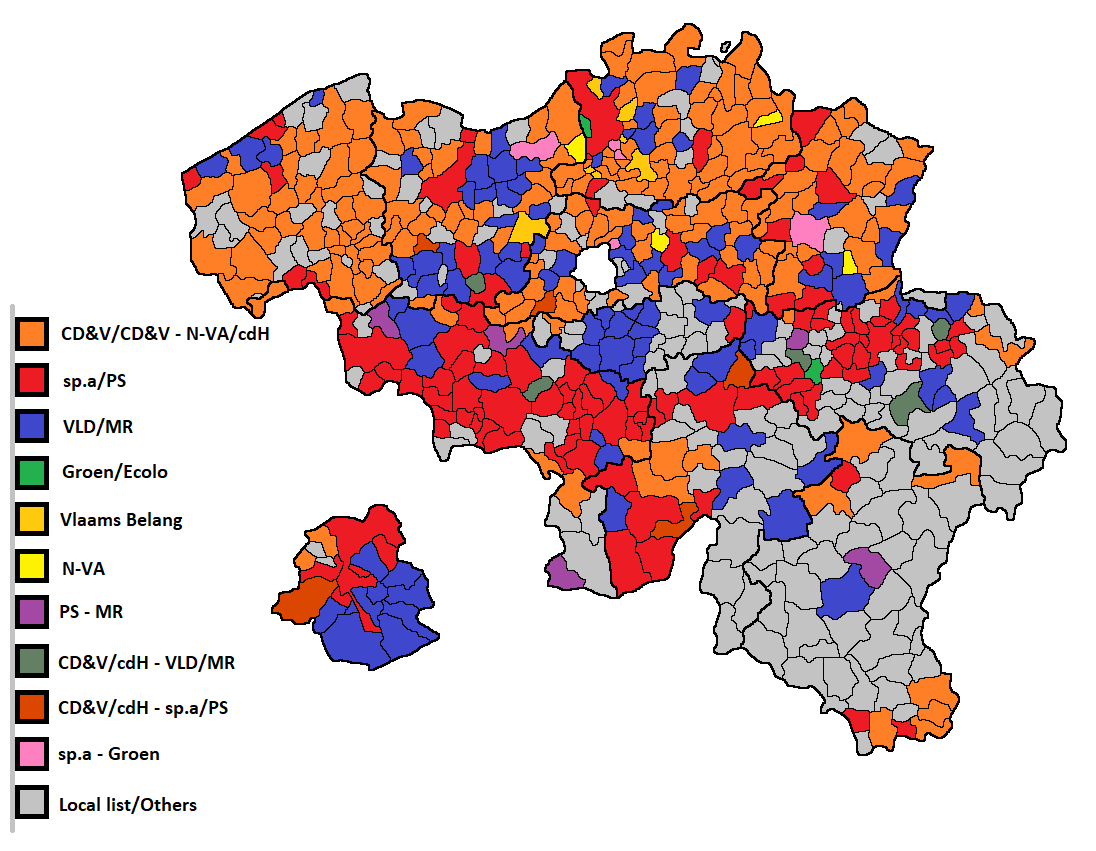

The Belgian provincial, municipal and district elections of 2006 took place on Sunday 8 October 2006. The electors have elected the municipal councillors of 589 cities and towns (308 in the Flemish Region, 262 in the Walloon Region and 19 in the Brussels-Capital Region) as well as the ten provincial councils. The voters in the town of Antwerp have also been able to vote for the city's district councils. In seven Flemish municipalities with a special language statute (Drogenbos, Kraainem, Linkebeek, Sint-Genesius-Rode, Wemmel, Wezembeek-Oppem and Voeren) and in the Walloon municipality of Comines-Warneton the aldermen and the members of the OCMW/CPAS council have also been directly elected.

It was the first municipal and provincial elections since the transfer of the competence with regard to the municipalities and provinces to the regions, also residents without E.U. citizenship could vote for the first time if they had registered to vote. The previous municipal and provincial elections took place on Sunday 8 October 2000.

City and provincial councillors are elected to a six-year term. Newly elected councillors took office in January 2007, with the term ending in 2013.

Points of notice are the result of the governing federal government coalition (liberal/social-democrat) – for whom a bad result could spell defeat in the federal general elections to be held no later than June 2007 – and the result of the Vlaams Belang party in Antwerp and the other Flemish towns.

== Organisation ==
The municipal and provincial elections of 2006 were the first of its kind to be organized by the Regions instead of the federal government. The competence with regard to the municipalities and provinces was transferred from the federation to the Regions by special law of 13 June 2001.

Official logo of the municipal and provincial elections in the Walloon Region

Official logo of the municipal and provincial elections in the Flemish Region

The Flemish minister of the Interior Marino Keulen announced that the results of the elections held in the Flemish Region would be available in real time on the official dedicated government website www.vlaanderenkiest.be.

== Municipal elections ==
These have taken place in Flanders, Wallonia and the Brussels Capital Region. The municipal councils were elected by a very rare form of party-list proportional representation, the Imperiali highest averages method.

The parties presented themselves with lists of candidates. The number of candidates on the list usually was the total number of seats to be taken in the council. Each list received a random number, which was assigned by a lottery. Parties that had representatives in the regional parliaments, could receive a number that is the same in the entire region. Other parties' numbers varied from municipality to municipality. These numbers started after the regional numbers (8 and higher in Flanders, 14 and higher in Brussels, 6 and higher in Wallonia).

The regional list numbers:

Flemish Region	Brussels Region	Walloon Region
1. SP.a; 2. VLD; 3. Spirit; 4. N-VA; 5. Groen!; 6. Vlaams Belang; 7. CD&V	1. PS; 2. MR; 3. Groen!; 4. VLD-Vivant; 5. Vlaams Belang; 6. FDF; 7. CD&V; 8. MCC; 9. Ecolo; 10. Spirit; 11. Front National; 12. CdH; 13. N-VA	1. Front National; 2. Ecolo; 3. PS; 4. MR; 5. CdH

== Provincial elections ==
These have taken place in Flanders and Wallonia. In the Brussels Capital Region no provincial elections were held as Brussels is not part of any Belgian province, the provincial competences almost entirely being assumed by the Region, the Agglomeration and the Community Commissions.

The list numbers used were the same as for the municipalities.

== Polls ==
=== Flemish region ===
==== Het Laatste Nieuws ====
The polls conducted by the Stemmenkampioen site of Het Laatste Nieuws and the Vrije Universiteit Brussel, yielded the following overall result for Flanders, compared to the 2004 regional elections (the last column displays the difference between the latest polls and that result):

Party/Alliance	06/2004 (%)	12/2005 (%)	03/2006 (%)	05/2006 (%)	06/2006 (%)	09/2006 (%)	diff '04 (%)
CD&V – N-VA	26.1	30.9	31.7	30.7	30.6	31.1	+5.0
Vlaams Belang	24.2	26.8	27.4	28.2	28.9	28.2	+4.0
SP.a – Spirit	19.7	17.9	17.0	17.3	17.5	17.3	−2.4
VLD – Vivant	19.8	14.5	14.7	14.5	14.1	14.2	−5.6
Groen!	7.6	6.6	6.6	6.7	6.5	6.1	−1.5
Others	2.7	3.2	2.7	2.6	2.4	3.1	+0.4

The last poll not taking into account alliances dates from September 2006 and showed these results:

Party	Results (%)
Vlaams Belang	28.2
CD&V	23.3
SP.a	15.9
VLD	13.6
N-VA	7.8
Groen!	6.1
Spirit	1.4
Vivant	0.6
Others	3.1

==== Standaard – VRT ====
The latest poll by De Standaard and VRT yielded the following overall results for Flanders, compared to the 2004 regional elections (the last column displays the difference between the latest polls and that result):

Party/Alliance	06/2004 (%)	02/2006 (%)	06/2006 (%)	diff '04 (%)
CD&V – N-VA	26.1	29.1	29.4	+3.3
Vlaams Belang	24.2	22.5	23.1	−1.1
SP.a – Spirit	19.7	20.4	20.7	+1.0
VLD – Vivant	19.8	18.9	18.2	−1.6
Groen!	7.6	8.7	7.5	−0.1
Others	2.7	0.4	1.0	−1.7

==== Antwerp ====
Poll by the Gazet van Antwerpen and VRT, taken between 31 January and 23 February 2006, compared to the 2000 municipal elections (the last column displays the difference between the latest polls and that result):

Party	10/2000 (%)	02/2006 (%)	diff '00 (%)
Vlaams Belang – VLOTT	33.0	34.2	+1.2
SP.a – Spirit	19.5	23.8	+4.3
VLD – Vivant	18.5	12.9	−5.6
CD&V – N-VA	14.2	14.5	+0.3
Groen!	11.1	8.3	−2.8
Others	3.7	6.3	+2.6

July and September 2006 polls conducted by the Stemmenkampioen site of Het Laatste Nieuws and the Vrije Universiteit Brussel, yielded the following result for Antwerp, compared to the 2000 municipal elections (the last column displays the difference between the latest polls and that result):

Party	10/2000 (%)	07/2006 (%)	09/2006 (%)	diff '00 (%)
Vlaams Belang – VLOTT	33.0	34.2	38.6	+5.6
SP.a – Spirit	19.5	20.2	21.1	+1.6
VLD – Vivant	18.5	10.2	8.5	−10.0
CD&V – N-VA	14.2	19.4	16.6	+2.4
Groen!	11.1	7.2	6.2	−4.9
Others	3.7	8.8	9.0	−5.3

=== Walloon Region ===
A poll conducted by the RTBF and the Sud Presse in June 2006 showed the following results, compared to the 2000 municipal elections (the last column displays the difference between the latest polls and that result):

==== Charleroi ====
Party	10/2000 (%)	06/2006 (%)	diff '00 (%)
Socialist Party (Parti Socialiste)	51.4	31.9	−19.5
Reformist Movement (Mouvement Réformateur)	16.1	23.1	+7.0
Humanist Democratic Centre (Centre Démocrate Humaniste)	9.6	14.9	+5.0
Ecolo	11.4	11.0	−0.4
National Front (Front National)	6.9	16.5	+9.6

== Results ==
=== Flanders ===
==== Provinces ====
The provincial elections are the only 2006 elections that allow for a national comparison, since in municipal elections not all parties run in all municipalities.

Party	Votes	%	+/– (2000)	Seats	+/– (2000)
Christian Democratic and Flemish (CD&V)–New Flemish Alliance (N-VA)	1,231,655	30.6	*	136	*
Flemish Interest (VB)	879,046	20.7		88	▲34
Socialist Party Different (SP.A)–Spirit	785,528	19.6		84	▲8
Open Flemish Liberals and Democrats (Open VLD)–Vivant	745,952	18.9		80	▼27
Green!	311,912	7.5		17	▼9
Union of Francophones (UF)	54,733			6	0
Other parties	57,782			—	
Valid votes	4,584,584				
Blanco and invalid votes					
Total				411	

Party	(Antwerp Province) Antwerp	East Flanders	Flemish Brabant	(Limburg (Belgium)) Limburg	West Flanders	Total
Christian Democratic and Flemish (CD&V)–New Flemish Alliance (N-VA)	24	25	25	26	36	136
Flemish Interest (VB)	25	19	15	15	19	88
Socialist Party Different (SP.A)–Spirit	18	14	14	20	18	84
Open Flemish Liberals and Democrats (Open VLD)–Vivant	13	22	17	14	14	80
Green!	4	4	7	0	2	17
Union of Francophones (UF)	−	−	6	−	−	6

==== Municipalities ====
Most important conclusions are that Vlaams Belang achieves status quo in large cities as Antwerp, Brussels and Ghent but advances strongly in the countryside. The CD&V-N-VA gains nearly everywhere, VLD and Groen! lose nearly everywhere. The VLD was able to consolidate where they put forth nationally known candidates, like Guy Verhofstadt in Ghent and Vincent Van Quickenborne in Kortrijk. The SP.A-Spirit puts strong results in cities like Antwerp, Ghent and Ostend but has mixed results in other places.

Most coalitions before the elections can continue with a stronger backing, most notably in Ghent and Mechelen. An exception to this general 'rule' is Vilvoorde, where former prime minister Jean-Luc Dehaene loses his majority.

===== Antwerp =====
Party	Leader	2000 (%)	seats 2000	2006 (%)	seats 2006
SP.a – SPIRIT *	Patrick Janssens	19.5	12	35.5	22
Vlaams Belang – VLOTT	Filip Dewinter	33.0	20	33.5	20
VLD – Vivant	Ludo Van Campenhout	18.5	10	9.7	5
CD&V – N-VA *	Philip Heylen	11.1	6	11.2	6
Groen!	Freya Piryns	11.1	6	4.7	2
VU-ID *		3.1	1	–	–
Others		3.9	0	6.2	0

  - In 2001 the VU-ID split up in 2 wings: the centre-right Flemish nationalist NVA, which formed a cartel with the Christian Democratic CD&V and the social-liberal Spirit which formed a cartel with the Socialist SPA.

Bruges

Party	Leader	Votes	%	Seats
CD&V / N-VA	Patrick Moenaert	32,092	38.86	20
SP.A / Spirit	Frank Vandevoorde	20,028	25.25	12
Flemish Interest	Frank Vanhecke	13,408	16.24	8
Open VLD / Vivant	Mercedes Van Volcem	9,520	11.53	5
Green!	Rita Brauwers	5,328	6.45	2
Other parties		2.207	2.67	—
Valid votes		82,583	89.12	
Invalid votes		3,776	4.07	
Blanco votes		6,310	6.81	
Total		92,669	100	47

Ghent

Party	Leader	Votes	%	Seats	+/–
SP.A / Spirit	Daniël Termont	49.265	31.58	17	3 ▲
Open VLD / Vivant	Sas Van Rouveroij	32,819	21.04	11	0
Flemish Interest	Francis Van Den Eynde	28,152	18.05	9	2 ▼
CD&V / N-VA	Filip Van Laecke	24,698	15.83	8	3 ▼
Green!	Vera Dua	18,808	12.06	6	2 ▲

Ostend

Party	Leader	Votes	%	Seats
SP.A / Spirit	Jean Vandecasteele	22,142	45.67	20
Flemish Interest	Christian Verougstraete	8,157	16.82	7
Open VLD / Vivant	Bart Tommelein	7,793	16.07	6
CD&V / N-VA	Hilde Veulemans	6,821	14.07	5
Green!	Wouter De Vriendt	2,893	5.97	1
Other parties		678	1.40	—
Valid votes		48,484		
Invalid votes				
Blanco votes				
Total				39
Notes: The Socialist Party became the winner, under direction of Johan Vande Lanotte. Jean-Marie Dedecker, was a local candidate for the VLD, who in the run-up to the elections clashed severely with Vande Lanotte. Dedecker has since been ejected by the VLD and has formed his own party List Dedecker.

==== Districts (Antwerp) ====
Heavily anticipated were the results for Merksem, Deurne and Hoboken, where it was believed Vlaams Belang could obtain an absolute majority. This however did not turn out to be the case, even though the party does advance in all but two districts (Antwerp and Borgerhout). Most notably, in Hoboken a majority without Vlaams Belang will only be possible by including the extreme left PVDA, although another party, N-VA, has already ruled out such a coalition.

=== Wallonia ===
==== Municipalities ====
===== Namur =====
In Namur, the capital of Wallonia, the Socialist Party (PS) lost 7.4% of its votes, enough for the local Christian-democrats (cdH), Liberals (MR) and Greens (Ecolo) to start a coalition, breaking with the 30-year Socialist hegemony there. Jacques Etienne of chH will become the new mayor.
