= Ward Beysen =

Belgian politician (1941–2005)

- Ward Beysen
- Born: Eduard Marie August Beysen; 26 June 1941; Mortsel, Belgium
- Died: 14 January 2005 (aged 63); Wilrijk, Belgium
- Occupations: politician, freemason

Eduard Marie August "Ward" Beysen (26 June 1941 – 14 January 2005) was a Belgian politician and well-known freemason. He held a degree in Dutch and history teaching, obtained in 1963, in Lier and started his political career in the seventies in the Flemish liberal party, the Party for Freedom and Progress (PVV), which was renamed Flemish Liberals and Democrats (VLD) in 1992. Ward Beysen – suffering a depression – died by drowning himself in the lake of Fort 6 in the south of Antwerp.

== Political career ==
- 1974–1981, member of the Antwerp Province Council.
- 1981–1995, member of the Belgian Chamber of Representatives.
- 1985–1995, floor leader of the VLD in the Belgian Parliament.
- 1988, Minister of the Interior in the Flemish regional government.
- 1995–1999, member of the Flemish Parliament.
- 1999–2004, member of the European Parliament.
- 1989–2000, member of the Antwerp City Council.

== Dissatisfaction ==
In 1992, the PVV was transformed into the moderate-liberal VLD. Beysen accepted this change, in spite of him always insisting on moving more to the right. Beysen wanted to stop the rise of the far-right Vlaams Blok in Antwerp by adopting a more "rightist" rhetoric.

In 1991, he chose "the most important land is the innerland" (het belangrijkste land is het binnenland) as his election slogan, which was clearly based on the Vlaams Blok motto "the own people first" (eigen volk eerst). In 1994, he made security his main election campaign issue, just like the VB already did for many years. Because of this modus operandi – which was not at all successful in Antwerp – he was called "Black Beysen" (Zwartje Beysen) in certain media.

In 2000, he was punished by the party for several years of failing campaigns. Leo Delwaide became the liberal mayor candidate for Antwerp. Beysen ended in second place. In the same year, his party refused to support his candidacy for a vacant seat in the board of the largest public institute of higher education in Antwerp. The VLD endorsed the candidate of the other party. Beysen was publicly embarrassed and did not run for the seat which easily went to his opponent.

== Liberal appeal ==
Ward Beysen was dissatisfied with the increasingly leftist policies of the VLD. In 2003, the party made it clear that Ward Beysen – the incumbent – would no longer be their candidate for the European elections of 2004. Beysen was furious about this and left the party to start his own political party, the Liberaal Appèl (Liberal Appeal).

His new party was not at all successful. In 2003, it gained 1,21% of the popular vote in the Antwerp province, resulting in zero candidates elected in the parliament. In 2004, the LA did not participate in the regional elections. Beysen hoped to be given a high place on the Vlaams Blok-list for the European elections, but without any success.

After the death of Beysen, its founder, in 2005, the future of the party Liberaal Appèl was in doubt. Newspapers reported that it was being closed down on 19 March 2005, but the party leader had always refuted this. Liberaal Appèl is now known as "Liberaal Appèl Plus" (Liberal Appeal Plus).

For the 2006 municipal elections, the LAP rejoined the motherparty VLD. In 2007, the three Flemish liberal parties VLD, Vivant and Liberaal Appel decided to merge into one "cartel list" for the 2007 Belgian elections. The list was named Open Flemish Liberals and Democrats.

== See also ==
- VLOTT, the right-liberal party of ex-VLD senator Hugo Coveliers
- Nova Civitas, the classical-liberal thinktank of ex-VLD board member Boudewijn Bouckaert
- List Dedecker, the right-liberal party of ex-VLD senator Jean-Marie Dedecker
