= 1994 Belgian local elections =

9 October 1994	2000 →
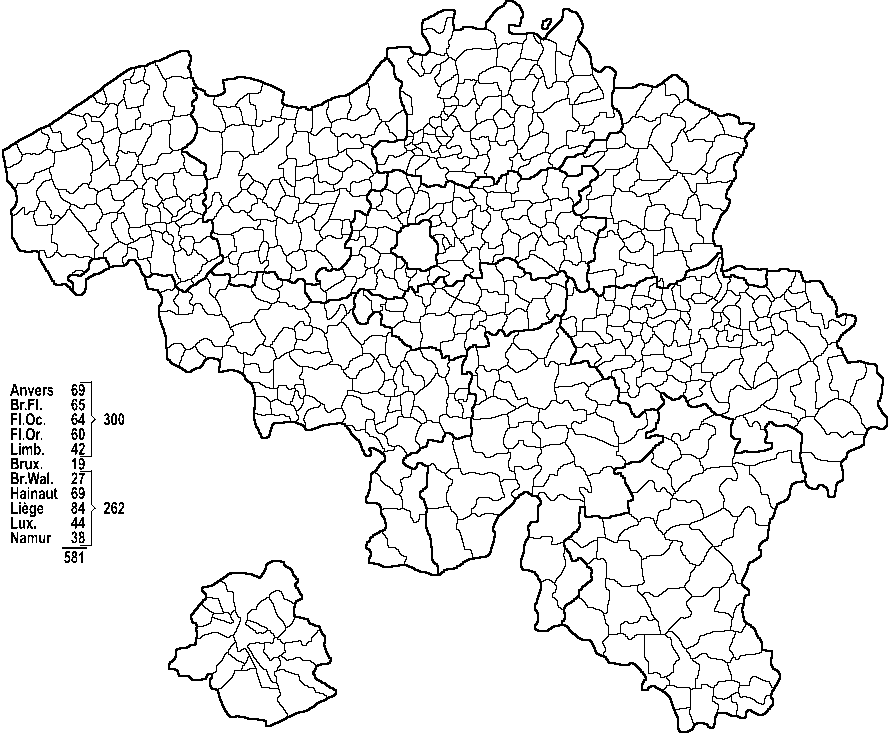

Local elections were held in Belgium on 9 October 1994. The ten provincial councils as well as all municipal councils were elected.

The election was, apart from the European election in June that year, the first one since the fourth state reform, which made provincial elections concurrent with municipal elections rather than with parliamentary elections. Legislative terms for provincial councils were thus increased from four years or less to six years. Additionally, the reform split the province of Brabant into Flemish Brabant and Walloon Brabant, thus increasing the number of provinces from nine to ten.

== Provincial councils ==
Flemish provinces
Province	Voters	Seats	CVP	VLD	SP	Agalev	VB	VU	Others
Antwerp	1,203,576	84	27	13	15	9	16	2	1 (WOW); 1 (PATSY)
Flemish Brabant	743,780	75	23	17	13	6	6	5	5 (UF)
West Flanders	862,508	84	40	15	20	4	3	2	
East Flanders	1,038,644	83	33	22	17	4	6	1	
Limburg	538,754	75	29	17	20	2	3	4	

Walloon provinces
Province	Voters	Seats	PS	PRL	PSC	Ecolo	FN	Others
Walloon Brabant	231.969	56	14	20	12	7	3	
Hainaut	860.476	84	40	17	18	5	4	
Liège	666.799	80	30; 1(SP)	16; 1(PPF)	18; 1(CSP)	8	1	3 (AGIR); 1 (PDB)
Luxembourg	171.690	47	12	15	19	1	0	
Namur	314.881	56	19	13	18	4	2	
