= 2000 Belgian local elections =

- 8 October 2000
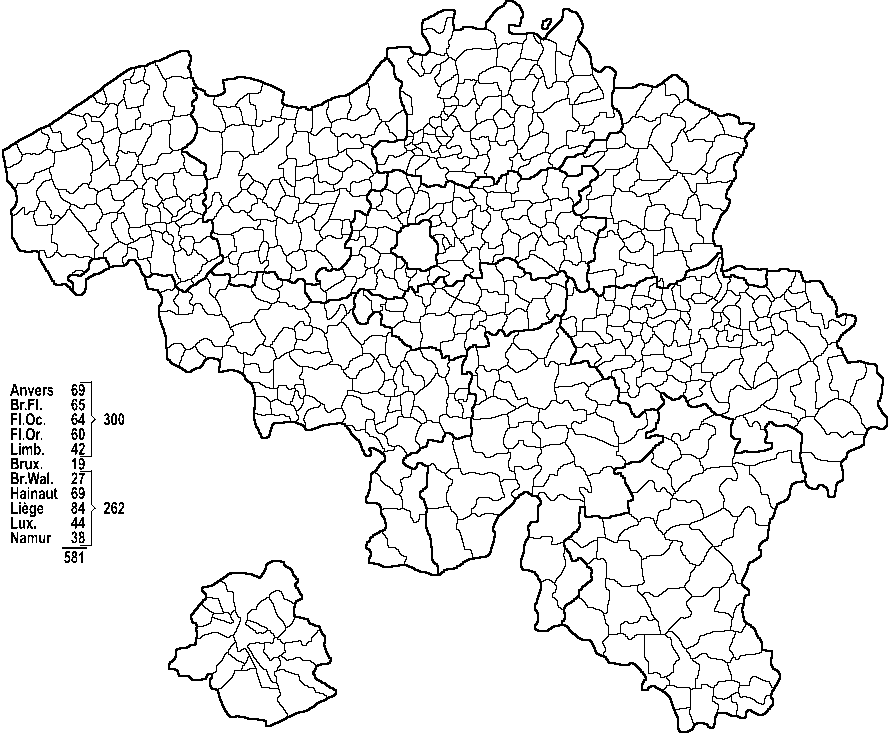

The Belgian provincial, municipal and district elections of 2000 took place on Sunday October 8, 2000. The electors elected the municipal councillors of 589 cities and towns (308 in the Flemish Region, 262 in the Walloon Region and 19 in the Brussels-Capital Region) as well as the ten provincial councils. Additionally, the newly established district councils in the city of Antwerp were elected for the first time.

Newly elected councillors took office in January 2001, with a six-year term ending in 2007. The next local elections took place on October 8, 2006.

Soon after this election, the federal government under Verhofstadt transferred the responsibility over local government to the three regional governments, including the responsibility of organising local elections.

== Flanders ==
=== Provinces ===
Party / Alliance	Antwerp	East Flanders	Flemish Brabant	Limburg	West Flanders	Total
CVP	21	25	22	27	33	128
VLD	20	27	21	18	20	106
SP	12	13	12	21	18	76
VB	20	12	10	7	5	54
Agalev	9	5	8	0	4	26
Volksunie	2	2	5	2	4	15
UF	–	–	6	–	–	6
Total	84	84	84	75	84	411

==== Antwerp ====
Party	Votes	%	+/–	Seats	+/–
Christian People's Party (Christelijke Volkspartij)	249,840	23.29	3.89 ▼	21	6 ▼
Flemish Block (Vlaams Blok)	237,142	22.11	4.96 ▲	20	4 ▲
Flemish Liberals and Democrats (Vlaamse Liberalen en Democraten)	222,306	20.72	5.82 ▲	20	7 ▲
Socialist Party (Socialistische Partij)	149,083	13.90	2.26 ▼	12	3 ▼
Agalev	120,911	11.27	0.39 ▼	9	0
People's Union (Volksunie & ID)	64,096	5.97	5.97 ▲	2	2 ▲

=== Municipalities ===
Antwerp
Party	Votes	%	+/–	Seats	+/–
Flemish Block	89,213	32.95	4.92 ▲	20	2 ▲
SP	52,760	19.49	0.97 ▼	12	1 ▼
VLD	45,903	16.95	4.96 ▲	10	3 ▲
CVP	30,096	11.12	—	6	—
Agalev	29,966	11.07	1.97 ▼	6	1 ▼
VU–ID	8,422	3.11	—	1	—
Valid votes	270,750	96.93			
Blanco and invalid votes	8,579	3.07			
Total	279,329	100.00	55		
Electorate and voter turnout	316,926	88.14			

Ghent
Party	Votes	%	+/–	Seats	+/–
SP	36,829	25.07	3.26 ▲	14	1 ▲
VLD	30,895	21.03	0.69 ▼	11	2 ▼
Flemish Block	28,699	19.54	6.88 ▲	11	4 ▲
CVP	26,344	17.93	3.63 ▼	10	2 ▼
Agalev	13,385	9.11	0.68 ▼	4	1 ▼
VU–ID	5,828	3.97	3.97 ▲	1	0
Other parties	4,910	3.34	—		
Valid votes	146,890	95.89			
Blanco and invalid votes	6,289	4.11			
Total	153,179	100.00		51	
Electorate and voter turnout	168,441	90.94			

== Wallonia ==
=== Provinces ===
Party / Alliance	Hainaut	Liège	Luxembourg	Namur	Walloon Brabant	Total
PS	39	33	11	19	13	115
PRL-MCC^{1}	19	20	18	17	–	74
PRL-FDF^{1}	–	–	–	–	23	23
PSC	13	13	16	13	8	63
Ecolo	12	12	2	7	11	44
FN	1	0	0	0	0	1
CSP^{2}	–	3	–	–	–	3
PFF^{2}	–	2	–	–	–	2
SP^{2}	–	1	–	–	–	1
Vivant	0	0	–	0	1	1
Total	84	84	47	56	56	327

1. The Parti Réformateur Libéral participated in the election in an electoral coalition with the Front Démocratique des Francophones in Walloon Brabant and with the Mouvement des Citoyens pour le Changement in the four other provinces.
2. The Christlich-Soziale Partei, the Partei für Freiheit und Fortschritt and the Sozialistische Partei are German-speaking parties. They are only active in the German-speaking Community of Belgium.
