= Matthias Storme =

Belgian academic, lawyer, & philosopher (born 1959)

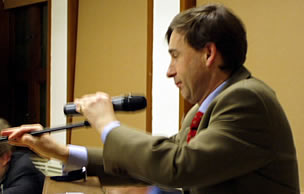
- Matthias Storme (courtesy of Luc van Braekel)
- Born: Matthias Edward Storme; 8 July 1959 (age 67); Ghent, Belgium
- Occupations: politician, lawyer, academic, philosopher

Matthias Edward Storme (born 8 July 1959) is a Belgian lawyer, academic and conservative philosopher.

== Family life ==
Storme was born and raised in a Catholic family in the Belgian city of Ghent. His father Marcel Storme (b. 1930) used to be a university law professor, lecturing on the topic of Civil Procedure, and a member of the Belgian Senate (1977–1981) for the Flemish Christian Democrats. His grandfather August De Schryver (1898–1992) held several ministerships in many Belgian governments, including the Belgian Exile Government in London during World War II. He held his seat in the Belgian Chamber of Representatives until the late 1965. His other grandfather Jules Storme was professor at the Ghent University.

== Studies ==
Storme was educated at the Jesuit College in Ghent, the Sint-Barbaracollege (Latin-Greek Humanities 1970–1976) and was a boy scout in the Sint-Barbara group.

He studied law and philosophy, first at the UFSIA in Antwerp (1976–1978) and further at the Catholic University of Leuven (1978–1981), where he obtained a master's degree in law.

As a student in Leuven, he was active in the Flemish nationalist Katholiek Vlaams Hoogstudentenverbond (KVHV) of Leuven, as well as in the Royal Flemish Law Society (Koninklijk Vlaams Rechtgenootschap, VRG). He later became a member of K.A.V. Lovania Leuven, a catholic student fraternity that is affiliated to the Cartellverband der katholischen deutschen Studentenverbindungen.

Storme also studied at Yale University in New Haven, completing a Master of Arts in philosophy (1982) as a Graduate Fellow of the Belgian American Educational Foundation. At Yale, he also was a member of the Party of the Right and the Calliopean Society.

After his university years in the United States, he continued his higher education at Bologna University, Italy and at the Max Planck Institute for International and Foreign Private Law in Hamburg, Germany. He received his doctorate on contract law under professor Walter van Gerven, a former advocate-general to the Court of Justice of the European Communities in Luxembourg.

== Professional life ==
Currently, Matthias Storme is a university professor attached to the University of Leuven and the University of Antwerp. His lectures include the topics of Civil Law, Bankruptcy Law, Comparative Law, Civil procedure and European Community Law. Outside the law school, he teaches a course on Comparative Religion and Ideology. He also writes for several academic and political magazines.

As a member of the Brussels Bar, he was president of the Brussels Young Bar Association (Vlaams Pleitgenootschap bij de balie te Brussel) (1995), member of the Bar Council 1996–1998, and member of the General Council of the Flemish Bars 1998 tot 2000 (Orde van Vlaamse balies).

He was three times asked to deliver the Opening lecture of the Bar, in Brussels in 1991, in Mechelen (Malines) in 2000 and in Oudenaarde (Audenaerde) in 2007. The latter discussed the legitimation of revolution and secession in history.

Storme is now a senior partner lawyer in Ghent, (until 2013 in Brussels, often pleading before the Court of Arbitration, the Belgian court for constitutional and civil rights matters (now called the Constitutional Court).

In 1999, Storme brought the Doel Case (a tiny Flemish village near the Scheldt river which was to be evacuated and destroyed in order to make the growth of the Antwerp port possible) to court on behalf of the local inhabitants, assigning the Flemish government.

He also brought a case in 2007, before the Constitutional Court that seeks to overturn Belgian laws that he claims are limiting the exercise of freedom of speech. A similar lawsuit was started earlier by prominent Vlaams Belang members.

Other cases before the Constitutional Court concern the introduction of same-sex marriage, modification of electoral laws, the protection of the professional privilege of lawyers against EU-legislation, etc.

== Academic activities and influence ==
As a scholar, Matthias Storme publishes mainly in the field of private law and tries to enrich the Belgian law by integrating elements of comparative law. In his doctoral thesis on Good faith, he developed the theory of "burdens" (lasten) inspired by the German doctrine of Obliegenheiten. He developed the theory of confidence in private law, i.a. in his pre-advice for the Vereniging voor de vergelijkende studie in België en Nederland. A lot of his work concerns a further systematisation of general concepts of patrimonial law, such as representation, authority to dispose, separate patrimonies and funds, trustlike concepts, property of securities and a systematical approach to security rights.

He published articles in legal theory and legal history on the evolution of law, especially the development of law through case law and the juridification of society. He also published on questions of comparative law and constitutional law and writes a work on Legal Traditions and Systems of the World.

He is an expert appointed by the Flemish Government in the Belgian Commission on the Framework Convention for the Protection of National Minorities.

From 1992 until the end of its activities in 2003, he was a member of the Commission on European Contract Law, the so-called Lando Commission, and he continues to be a member, since 2000, of the Study Group on a European Civil Code and the so-called European Acquis Group. These groups work together in writing a Draft "Common Frame of reference" for European Contract Law and more generally European Private Law (6th framework program of the European Union). Storme is a member of the 10-person "Compilation and redaction Team" finalising this draft. The interim version of the Draft CFR was published on 1 January 2008. Storme is also a member of the Académie des Privatistes Européens in Pavia.

He helped to start the comparative law project "Trento common core project" directed by Ugo Mattei (University of Torino) and Mauro Bussani (University of Trento).

He is one of the founders of the European Law Institute (ELI) in 2011.

He is editor in chief (originally with Ewoud Hondius, since 2016 with André Janssen) of the European Review of Private Law, of which he was one of the founders in 1991. He is also member of the Board of Editors of the main private law journal in Belgium, the Tijdschrift voor Privaatrecht, and since 2014 one of the 2 directors of that review.

He was a board member of the Centrum Pieter Gillis, a thinktank on pluralism attached to the University of Antwerp and is since 2014 member of the Board of Unia, the Belgian agency on discrimination and equal opportunities.

== Awards ==
In 2000, he received the André Demedts Award.

Because of his efforts to promote liberty and political freedom, he was awarded the Prize for Liberty by the classic-liberal thinktank Nova Civitas in 2005. The Prize was awarded earlier to Luuk van Middelaar and to Ayaan Hirsi Ali and afterwards to senator Alain Destexhe (2006) and writer and journalist Derk Jan Eppink (2007).

In 2006, he was nominated Honorary senator, i.e. a member of the European Honorary Senate of the Movement for a United States of Europe.

== Speeches ==
In 1998, he delivered the annual speech to the Flemish Entreprise Association in Brussels ("V.E.V.-Comité Brussel"), defending Flemish secession from Belgium and independence as a member state of the European Union (23 September 1998).

He lectured at several international law conferences (in Coimbra, New Orleans, Rouen, Groningen, Utrecht, Athens, Jerusalem, Budapest, Trento, Lille, Stellenbosch, Maastricht, Poitiers, Freiburg, Lleida, Salzburg, Porto, Trier, Luzern, Münster, Tartu, etc.).

In 2000, he delivered the opening speech of the Bar at Mechelen, pleading for a devolution of the judicial system from the federal state to the autonomous communities.

At the Third Ethical Forum of the Fondation universitaire in Brussels on 25 November 2004 (organised by Philippe Van Parijs), he gave a speech on "Free speech and the ideology of multiculturalism".

In 2005, when receiving the Prize of Liberty ("Prijs voor de vrijheid"), he held the traditional Gustave de Molinari lecture, in which he proclaimed that "the most fundamental freedom is the freedom to discriminate", directly attacking and rejecting the existing Belgian "totalitarian" legislation restricting freedom of choice in private relationships.

In 2006, when he was nominated a member of the European Honorary Senate of the Movement for a United States of Europe, he delivered a speech entitled "The European values: protect them against the values of the European Constitution".

== Socio-cultural and political activities ==
- President of the Order of the Flemish Lion (Orde van de Vlaamse Leeuw).
- Member of the Flemish Journalists Association (Vlaamse Journalistenvereniging).
- Contributor to several blogs, notably In Flanders Fields, The Brussels Journal and the Flemish Conservatives.
- Former chairman (1996–2004) of the Flemish Academics Union (Verbond der Vlaamse Academici).
- Former chairman (1996–2001) of the Alliance of Flemish Organizations (Overlegcentrum van Vlaamse Verenigingen).
- Member of the classic-liberal thinktank Nova Civitas, now Libera!
- Honorary senator (2006- ) to the Movement for a United States of Europe (Beweging voor de Verenigde Staten van Europa).
- Member of the Order of the Prince (Orde van den Prince).
- Member of Vision and Reality (Visie en Werkelijkheid), a thinktank based on the principles of Christian-Democracy.
- Member (former board member) of the General Dutch Alliance (Algemeen Nederlands Verbond).
- Member (former board member) of the Flemish People's Movement (Vlaamse Volksbeweging).
- Member (former board member) of the Flemish Lawyers Association (Vlaamse Juristenvereniging) and the Flemish Public Law Conference (Vlaamse Staatsrechtsconferentie).
- Committee Member of the Eleven Days for Flanders-Europe (Elfdaagse Vlaanderen-Europa) and the Movement for Flanders-Europe (Beweging Vlaanderen-Europa).
- Member of the secessionist thinktank Denkgroep in De Warande.
- Former editor of the Dutch conservative paper, Bitter Lemon.

In 2004, a few days after the conviction of three organisations of the Vlaams Blok party for "the incitement of hate and discrimination" by the Ghent Court of Appeal, Storme told a journalist of newspaper "De Morgen" that "because all so-called democratic parties had supported the freedom-killing antiracism statute, it was nearly a moral duty for every freedom-loving Fleming to vote for the Vlaams Blok in the next election." Afterwards, Storme stepped down as member of the board of the New Flemish Alliance party. In the beginning of 2011, he was again elected as member of the board of the N-VA and re-elected in 2015. He was a candidate for the European Parliament in the 2014 elections.

== See also ==
- Boudewijn Bouckaert
- Center for European Renewal
- Doel Case
- Flemish People's Movement
- Liberal conservativism
- Libertarianism
- Nova Civitas
- Vlaams Belang
- Yale Political Union
