= Derk Jan Eppink =

Dutch politician

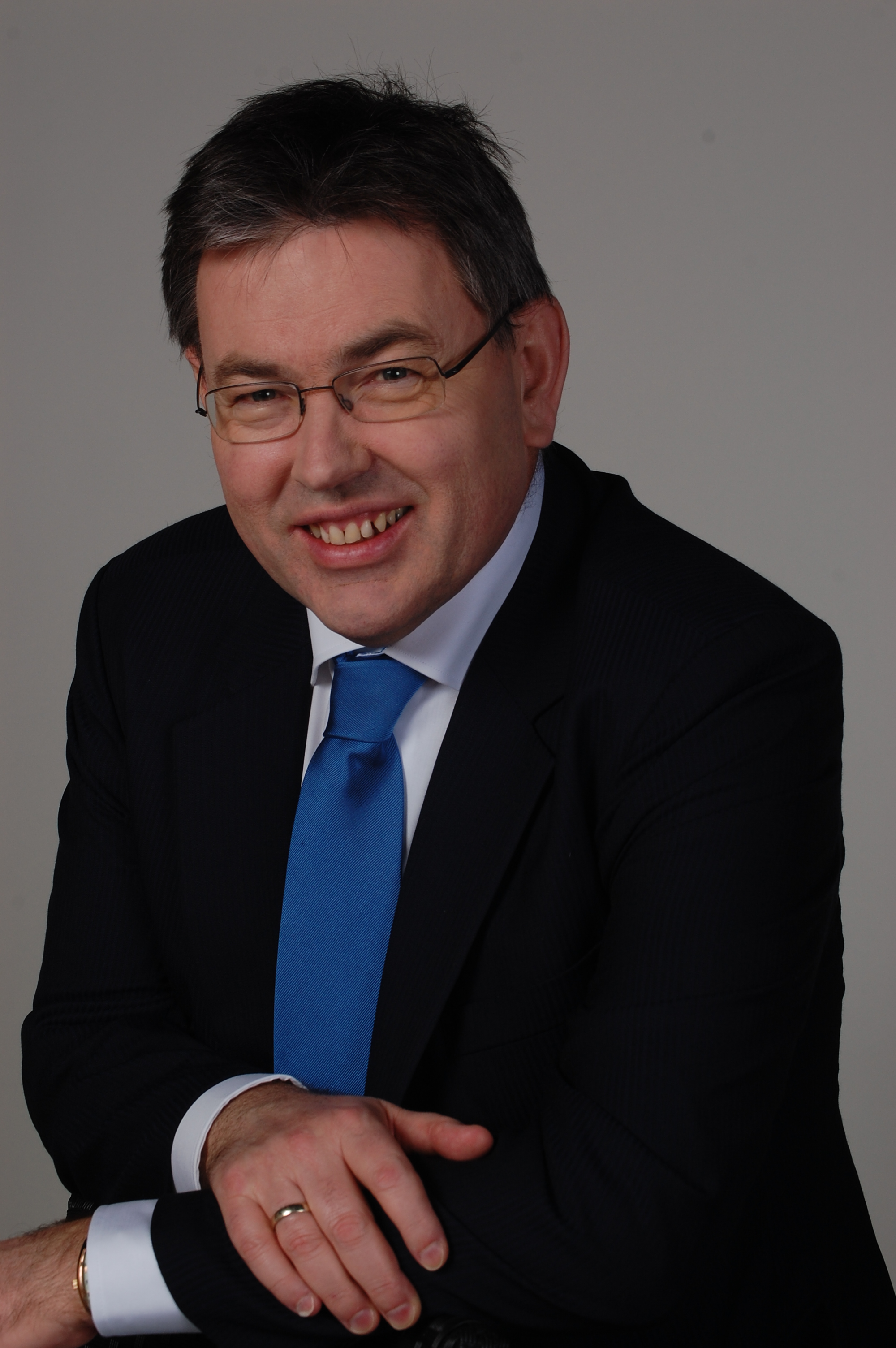
- Eppink in 2014

Vice-Chair of the European Conservatives and Reformists Dutch Delegation
- In office 11 December 2011 – 12 June 2014

Member of the House of Representatives
- In office 31 March 2021 – 5 December 2023

Member of the European Parliament
- In office 1 July 2019 – 30 March 2021
- Constituency: Netherlands

Personal details
- Born: 7 November 1958 (age 67) Steenderen, Netherlands
- Party: BBB (2023–present)
- Other political affiliations: VVD (1999–2018); LDD (2009–2014); FvD (2018–2020); JA21 (2020–2023)
- Occupation: Journalist • Politician

Derk Jan Eppink (born 7 November 1958) is a Dutch journalist, politician in the Netherlands, and former cabinet secretary for European Commissioners Bolkestein (1999–2004) and Kallas (2004–2007). In 2009, he was elected to the European Parliament for List Dedecker, and in 2019 for Forum for Democracy. In 2021, he became an MP in the Dutch House of Representatives for the JA21 party, but in 2023 he switched to the Farmer-Citizen Movement.

He sits on the European Conservatives and Reformists Group Executive.

Eppink was born in Steenderen, Gelderland. He studied Dutch law at the Vrije Universiteit Amsterdam (1977–1981) and thereafter European law and International Politics at the University of Amsterdam. In 1984 he moved to Brussels to become trainee at the European Commission. Thereafter he worked for three years as assistant to Members of the European Parliament.

In 1987, Derk Jan Eppink joined the Dutch newspaper NRC Handelsblad where he was assigned to the foreign desk. He covered South Africa, worked as correspondent in Poland and became political editor reporting on Dutch politics in The Hague. In 1995, he moved to the Flemish newspaper De Standaard where he reported on Belgian politics. He wrote two books on his experiences in Belgian politics: Vreemde Buren (Odd neighbors), Avonturen van een Nederbelg (Adventures of a Nether-Belgian).

In October 1999, he started working as member of cabinet of Dutch European Commissioner Frits Bolkestein. He was Bolkestein's liaison with the European Parliament, speechwriter and also assigned to liberalization of postal markets. In 2004, in co-operation with Bolkestein, he published the book The Limits of Europe. In October 2004 Eppink joined the cabinet of Siim Kallas, European Commissioner from Estonia, responsible for administration, audit and anti-fraud. In March 2007 Eppink published his book Life of a European Mandarin describing his experiences in the European Commission. The book has been published in Dutch, French, English, Estonian, and Czech.

In 2007 Eppink moved to New York City as his wife worked for the United Nations. He reported on the 2008 American presidential election for Flemish magazines Knack and Trends. He wrote a column on foreign affairs for Dutch weekly Elsevier and is contributor to various Dutch and Flemish radio and television programs, like VRT, Aktua-TV, NOS Met het Oog op Morgen, RTL Business Class. He wrote in 2011-2012 a column for NRC Handelsblad and since 2013 he writes for De Volkskrant.

His speeches on video can be retrieved through the Roosevelt Academy in Middelburg, the University of Maastricht, the University of Mississippi and Mississippi National Public Radio.

In January 2007, Eppink received the 2006 Prize of Liberty from the Flemish libertarian think tank Nova Civitas.

In 2009, Eppink returned to Belgium to run for the European Parliament for the List Dedecker party. He shares similar views to the party's leader Jean-Marie Dedecker.

In an article in November 2013, Eppink made the point that fiscal consolidation in Ireland had worked well, and that the breakdown in Greece could not be blamed on so-called 'austerity'.

Not re-elected in 2014, in July 2019 he was elected a member of the European Parliament for the Dutch right wing party Forum for Democracy (FvD). In 2020, Eppink, along with the FvD's two other MEPs. He subsequently joined the JA21 party and in 2021 was elected to the Dutch House of Representatives for the party.

Eppink signed the Madrid Charter, a document drafted by the far-right Spanish party Vox that describes left-wing groups as enemies of Ibero-America involved in a "criminal project" that are "under the umbrella of the Cuban regime".

== Electoral history ==
Electoral history of Derk Jan Eppink
Year	Body	Party	Pos.	Votes	Result		Ref.
Year	Body	Party	Pos.	Votes	Party seats	Individual	Ref.
2021	House of Representatives	JA21	3	2,966	3	Won	
2023	House of Representatives	Farmer–Citizen Movement	25	552	7	Lost	
