= Libertair, Direct, Democratisch =

Libertarian, Direct, Democratic Libertair, Direct, Democratisch
- Leader: Jean-Marie Dedecker
- Founded: 2007
- Split from: Open VLD
- Headquarters: National Secretariat; Bellevue 5; 9050 Gent
- Ideology: Libertarianism; National liberalism; Conservative liberalism; Right-wing populism; Euroscepticism
- Political position: Right-wing
- European affiliation: Alliance of European Conservatives and Reformists (2010–2014)
- European Parliament group: European Conservatives and Reformists Group (2011–2014)
- Colours: Light blue Orange
- Former names: Cassandra; Lijst Dedecker
- Chamber of Representatives (Flemish seats): 0 / 87
- Senate (Flemish seats): 0 / 35
- Flemish Parliament: 0 / 124
- Brussels Parliament (Flemish seats): 0 / 17
- European Parliament (Flemish seats): 0 / 12

Website
- www.ldd.be

Libertarian, Direct, Democratic (Dutch: Libertair, Direct, Democratisch, pronounced [libərˈtɛːr diˈrɛkt deːmoːˈkraːtis]; LDD) is a conservative-liberal, libertarian, right-wing populist Flemish political party in Belgium.

The party surprised commentators by winning five seats in the Chamber and one seat in the Senate in 2007, and eight seats in the 2009 Flemish Parliament election. The party remained with only one federal seat after the 2010 election. Previously known as List Dedecker, the party adopted its current name on 22 January 2011.

From 2011 to 2014, the LDD's MEP, Derk Jan Eppink, was with the European Conservatives and Reformists (ECR) group in the European Parliament.

== History ==
The party was founded in January 2007 by Senator Jean-Marie Dedecker as List Dedecker (Lijst Dedecker; also 'LDD'). Dedecker had left the New Flemish Alliance to found the LDD after the Cassandra think tank judged in 2006 that there was room for a right-wing conservative-liberal movement in the Flemish Community, expressing the need for a "common sense party." Dedecker also claimed he wanted to be the Flemish party political equivalent of Geert Wilders and Pim Fortuyn.

The 2007 federal election was the first ever election contested by Lijst Dedecker. They met the 5% threshold for parliamentary representation, in spite of all pre-election polls dismissing the chances for the party. The party won five seats in the Chamber of Representatives and one seat in the Senate, surprising many of its opponents.

In the 2009 Flemish and European elections, Lijst Dedecker won a disappointing eight seats in the Flemish Parliament and one seat in the European Parliament despite pre-election polls that had indicated a bigger share of the votes for Lijst Dedecker. On 25 June, one member of the LDD fraction crossed the floor to the Open Flemish Liberals and Democrats, leaving the LDD caucus with seven remaining seats.

After the 2010 federal election, the LDD returned one representative to the Chamber of Representatives.

In the 2014 federal election, the LDD received of the 0.4% of the vote, returning no representatives.

The party did not run in the 2019 federal election and instead focused its activities at a local level. The party currently maintains a chapter in Middelkerke where Dedecker was elected mayor by a large margin in 2019. Peter Reekmans was also elected as mayor of Glabbeek affiliated to the LDD. Dedecker was also returned for a brief period as an MP to the Chamber of Representatives in 2019, but as an independent candidate.

== Ideology ==
The party's economic program is predominantly based on free market economics, a flat tax system, the reform of unemployment benefits and social security schemes and the fight against waste and corruption.

Furthermore, LDD stands for the introduction of a binding referendum, the abolition of barriers for new political parties in Belgium and a tougher approach towards crime. The party also strives for a more independent Flanders. LDD is widely considered to be liberal on social issues, in spite of having a strong traditional conservative wing as well. The party takes a eurosceptic stance towards the European Union and wants a more strict immigration policy.

At the European level, the party allied itself with moderate Eurosceptics such as the British Conservative Party, the Czech Civic Democrats and the Polish Law and Justice, and sits on the European Conservatives and Reformists group in the European Parliament. LDD was initially expected to align themselves with the European Liberal Democrat and Reform Party (ELDR) after an open invitation to this effect by ELDR chairwoman Annemie Neyts. Prior to joining the ECR group, LDD was also briefly courted by Declan Ganley's pan-European movement Libertas.

LDD opposes the cordon sanitaire that is used to keep the far-right separatist Vlaams Belang from power, claiming that it is unsuccessful and undemocratic. Some critics even argue that the electoral success of LDD has hampered further growth of Vlaams Belang by virtue of attracting right-wing or protest votes that otherwise would have gone to that party.

At a given point in 2008, LDD was also looking for a political joint venture in Wallonia with liberal economist Rudy Aernoudt as their partner in this endeavour. In 2010, talks were undertaken with the People's Party of Mischaël Modrikamen, which Aernoudt had helped co-found, about political cooperation, but with no tangible result.

== Representation ==
The party currently isn't represented in any Belgian parliament, nor in the European Parliament.

== Electoral results ==
=== Federal Parliament ===
Chamber of Representatives (Kamer van Volksvertegenwoordigers)
Election year	# of overall votes	% of overall vote	% of language group vote	# of overall seats won	# of language group seats won	+/–	Government
2007	268,648	4.0	(#5)	5 / 150	5 / 88		in opposition
2010	150,577	2.3	(#7)	1 / 150	1 / 88	▼4	in opposition

Senate (Senaat)
Election year	# of overall votes	% of overall vote	% of language group vote	# of overall seats won	# of language group seats won	+/–
2007	223,992	3.4		1 / 40	1 / 25	
2010	130,777	2.0		0 / 40	0 / 25	▼1

=== Regional parliaments ===
==== Brussels Parliament ====
Election year	# of overall votes	% of overall vote	% of language group vote	# of overall seats won	# of language group seats won	+/–	Government
2009	1,957		3.8 (#7)	0 / 89	0 / 17		

==== Flemish Parliament ====
Election year	# of overall votes	% of overall vote	# of overall seats won	+/–	Government
2009	313,176	7.6 (#6)	8 / 124		in opposition

=== European Parliament ===
Election year	# of overall votes	% of overall vote	% of electoral college vote	# of overall seats won	# of electoral college seats won	+/–
2009	296,699		7.3 (#7)	1 / 22	1 / 13	

== See also ==
- Liberal Appeal, the right-wing liberal party of former VLD floor leader Ward Beysen.
- Nova Civitas, the classical-liberal think tank of Boudewijn Bouckaert.
- Vlaamse Liberalen en Democraten, the social-liberal VLD party.
- VLOTT, the right-wing liberal party of former VLD senator Hugo Coveliers.
