= Guido Dumarey =

Belgian automotive entrepreneur

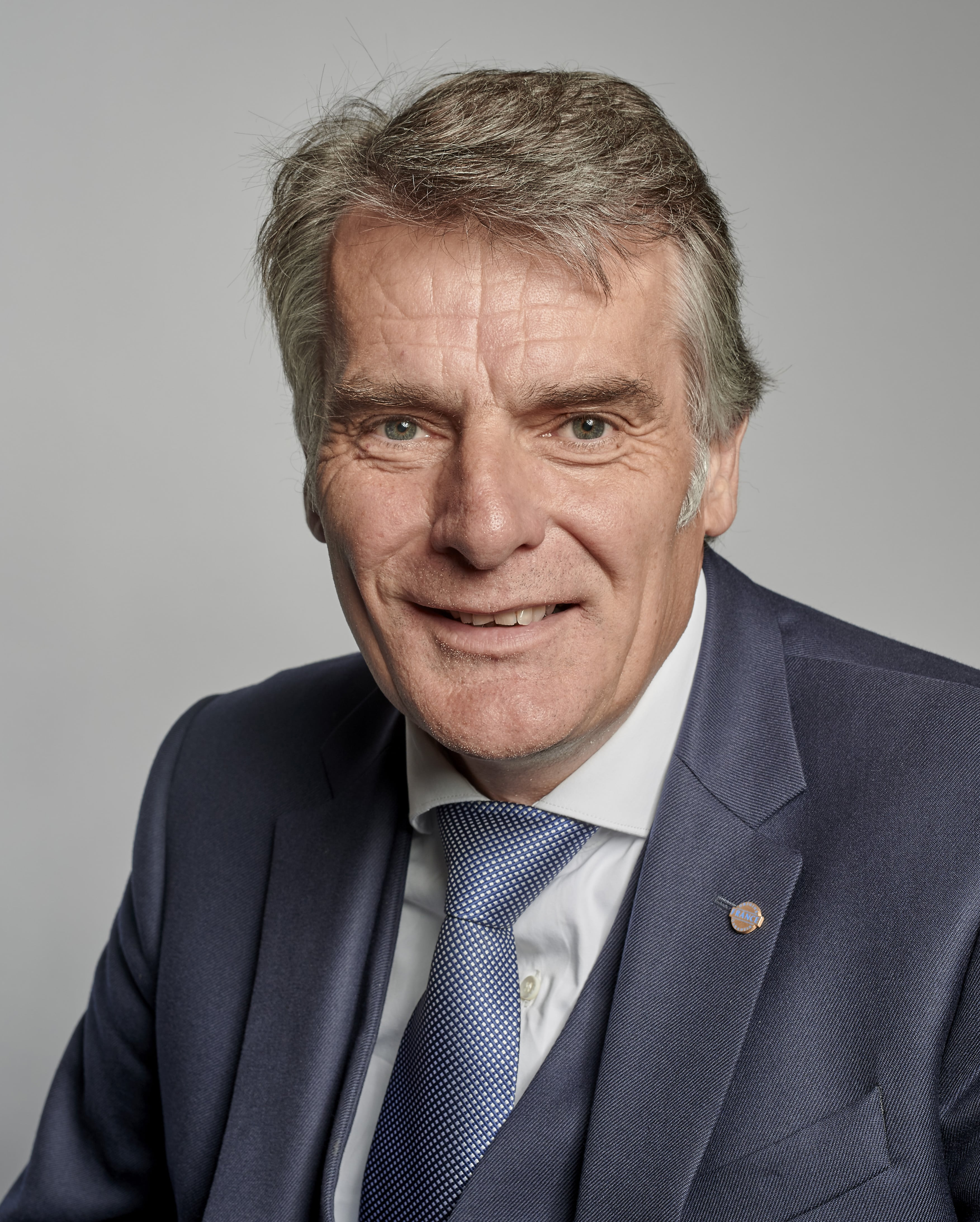
- Born: Guido Lieven Pieter Dumarey; 1959 (age 66–67)
- Occupation: Entrepreneur
- Children: 3, including Maxime

Guido Lieven Pieter Dumarey (born 1959 in Ostend, Belgium) is a Belgian entrepreneur, known for founding and presiding over the Dumarey Group.

A mechanical engineer in automotive, Dumarey commenced his career at Michelin before transitioning to entrepreneurship in 1983.

== Personal life ==
Dumarey lives in Sint-Martens-Latem. He is married and father of three children.

Beyond his business endeavors, Dumarey is passionate about cars and motorcycles. Through his company, GDM Motors, he engages in the restoration, purchase, and sale of classic (racing) cars, participating in various racing events.

== Career ==
During the early phase of his career (1983–1991), Dumarey acquired New Impriver, a Ghent-based company specializing in metal name-tags and aluminum anodization.

He later founded Punch Products in 1986, expanding its electronics component and assembly operations through partnerships with Sony and Panasonic in 1990. The company's growth led to the establishment of factories in the United Kingdom, Slovakia, Hungary, and Poland. A partnership with Philips in 1991 resulted in the creation of Punch Electronique in Dreux, France.

Dumarey's diversification efforts between 1999 and 2004 included acquiring Stevens and constructing a new plant in Evergem. The company's plastic operations were enhanced through the acquisition of Trelleborg, later known as Punch Plastics.

Punch International, listed on the Brussels Stock Exchange in 1999, initiated electronic component production in China in 2001. Further acquisitions in 2002 (Xeikon) and 2004 (Prolion) marked the company's entry into color production systems and the milk robot system industry, respectively.

Global expansion characterized the period between 2006 and 2010. Dumarey consolidated his telematics companies under Punch Telematix, which was sold to Trimble in 2010. In the same period Punch International acquired ZF Getriebe in Belgium, renaming it Punch Powertrain in 2008.Under Dumarey's leadership, Punch Powertrain diversified its product portfolio and expanded to Nanjing, China, in 2009, while divesting part of the stake in Punch International. All remaining parts in Punch Powertrain were sold off in 2010.

In 2012, Dumarey, along with Punch Metals International, acquired the GM factory in Strasbourg, France, naming it Punch Powerglide Strasbourg. In 2015, a daughter company was founded in Hong Kong and Tianjin, China.

In September 2023, the Punch Group celebrated its 40th anniversary and announced a name change to Dumarey Group, consolidating all entities under the Dumarey brand.

== Work ==
=== Automotive ===
In December 2015, Dumarey came to prominence in Australia, with plans to buy Holden's car manufacturing facilities scheduled to be shut down in 2017. These facilities were building the Holden Commodore and its derivatives, which are based on the GM Zeta platform and, in V6 configuration, were using six-speed automatic transmissions produced by Punch Powerglide. As part of his "Project Erich", Dumarey intended continuing to manufacture these large rear-wheel drive cars, as premium local and export products. The deal ultimately fell through

A pivotal moment occurred in 2020 when Dumarey Group acquired the GM Propulsion Engineering Centre in Turin, Italy, with some 750 employees. The research center specializes in propulsion systems, serving as Dumarey's main R&D center alongside Strasbourg and Silverstone.

Dumarey, in 2021 launched Hydrocells, a subsidiary in Turin, focusing on hydrogen technology. The European Investment Bank approved 40 million euros in funding in 2023 to support automotive engines powered by hydrogen, with research conducted in Turin and Strasbourg. A strategic partnership with Renault Group (now Horse Powertrain) was also established to design and promote a new generation of diesel engines in 2023.

In June 2023, Dumarey Group announced the acquisition of the Italian subsidiary of Vitesco Technologies (300 million turnover, 800 employees) for 1 January 2024 with the goal of a higher vertical integration for its future hydrogen engines.

=== Energy ===
In the energy sector, Dumarey acquired Flybrid Automotive in 2018, specializing in flywheel-based energy recovery technology. The company's innovative approach involves energy recovery during braking, with major brands like Volvo and Jaguar testing the technology. The company is headquartered at the Silverstone race track in the UK.

In 2024, Dumarey Flybrid acquired Time Shift BV, a Netherlands-based company specializing in innovative battery energy storage systems (BESS) using second life batteries from electric buses and trucks. This acquisition led to the formation of Dumarey Green Power, merging flywheel and battery storage technologies to create a unique energy management offering.

== Honours ==
In 2025 he was awarded the Prize for Liberty by the Flemish liberal think tank Libera!.
