= Luuk van Middelaar =

Dutch historian and political philosopher (born 1973)

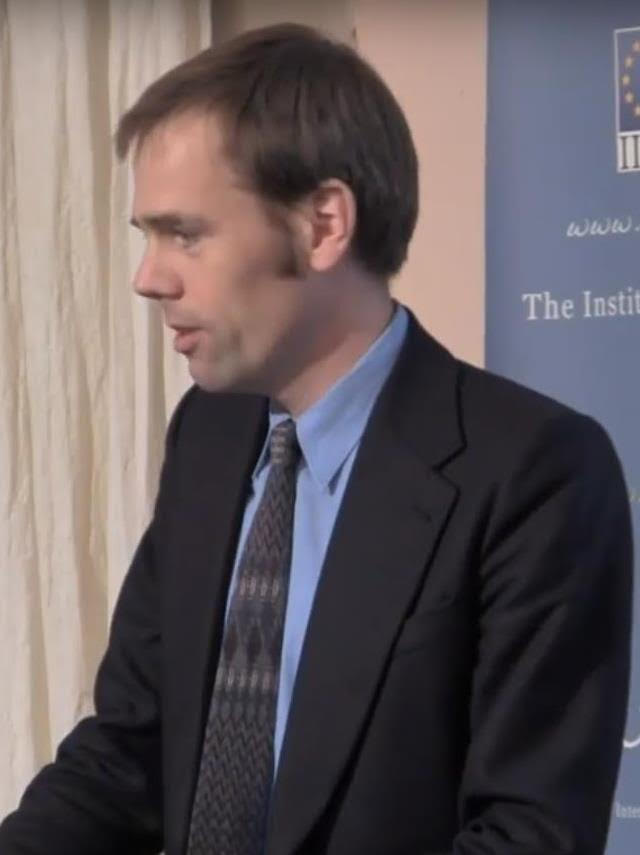
- Van Middelaar in 2014
- Born: Luuk Johannes van Middelaar; 9 May 1973 (age 53); Eindhoven, Netherlands
- Occupation: Writer
- Writing career
- Language: Dutch

Luuk Johannes van Middelaar (born 9 May 1973) is a Dutch historian and political philosopher. From 2010 to 2014 he was a member of the cabinet of Herman Van Rompuy, the first full-time President of the European Council, as an advisor and chief speechwriter. Van Middelaar is best known for his 2009 book The Passage to Europe.

== Biography ==
A native of Eindhoven, Van Middelaar studied history and philosophy at the University of Groningen and the Centre Raymond Aron of the École des Hautes Études en Sciences Sociale in Paris. In 1999 his master's thesis (doctoraalscriptie in Dutch) was published as Politicide and awarded the Prix de Paris and the Prize for Liberty (Nova Civitas). He became for a time an adviser and speechwriter to Frits Bolkestein (2002–2004) and Jozias van Aartsen (2004–2006). In 2009 he received his PhD from the University of Amsterdam with a cum laude distinction. In 2012 he was awarded the European Book Prize and the Prix Louis Martin for The Passage to Europe and Socrates Prize in 2010 for the best philosophy book written in Dutch.

Since early 2015 he has had a weekly political column in NRC Handelsblad, taking up again a position he held from 2008 to 2009. In 2015 he was appointed Professor of the Foundations and Practice of the European Union and its Institutions at Leiden University in the Netherlands. He also holds a chair in European Values at the French-speaking Catholic University of Louvain in Belgium. Since 2018 he has been a member of the Dutch Advisory Council on International Affairs.

In October 2022, van Middelaar co-founded the Brussels Institute for Geopolitics, a geopolitical think tank based in Brussels, Belgium where he continues to serve as director.

== Bibliography ==
=== Books written by van Middelaar ===
- Politicide: De moord op de politiek in de Franse filosofie (Politicide: The Murder of Politics in French Philosophy; master's thesis, published in the series Kennis, openbare mening, politiek). Amsterdam: Van Gennep, 1999.
- De passage naar Europa, Geschiedenis van een begin. Groningen: Historische uitgeverij, 2009. Translated into 11 languages.
  - Translated into French 2012 as Le passage à l'Europe. Histoire d'un commencement. Paris: Gallimard. Revised edition with a new foreword.
  - Translated into English 2013 as The Passage to Europe: How a Continent Became a Union. London and New Haven, CT: Yale University Press. Revised edition (including a Commentary section) with a new preface.
  - Translated into German 2016 as Vom Kontinent zur Union - Gegenwart und Geschichte des vereinten Europa. Berlin:Suhrkamp. New forewoonce more rd.
- Improvisatie & Oppositie: De nieuwe politiek van Europa. Groningen: Historische Uitgeverij, 2017.
  - Translated into French 2018 as Quand l’Europe improvise: dix ans de crises politiques. Paris: Gallimard, Le Débat. Updated version.
  - Translated into English 2019 as Alarums and Excursions: Improvising Politics on the European Stage. New York: Agenda Publishing.
- Een Europees pandemonium: Kwetsbaarheid en politieke kracht (A European pandemonium: Vulnerability and political power). Groningen: Historische Uitgeverij, 2021.
  - Translated into English 2021 as Pandemonium: Saving Europe. Newcastle upon Tyne: Agenda Publishing.

=== Books co-edited by van Middelaar ===
- with Madelon de Keizer: Utopie: utopisch denken, doen en bouwen in de twintigste eeuw (Utopia: Utopian Thinking, Acting and Building in the Twentieth Century) (Jaarboek van het Nederlands Instituut voor Oorlogsdocumentatie). Zutphen: Walburg Pers, 2002.
- with Philippe Van Parijs: After the Storm: How to Save Democracy in Europe with contributions from, among others, Amartya Sen, Pierre Manent, Jürgen Habermas, Ivan Krastev, David Miller, Pierre Rosanvallon and Larry Siedentop. Tielt: Lannoo, 2015.

=== Selected articles ===
Van Middelaar writes for various European journals and newspapers including Le Débat, Le Monde.

- "Three Things the EU Must Do to Survive", The Guardian, 27 March 2017.
