= Red! =

Socialist political party in Belgium

Red! Rood!
- Founded: 2011
- Ideology: Democratic socialism
- Political position: Left-wing
- Colours: Red

Website
- www.roodlinks.be

Red! (Dutch: Rood! or ROOD!) is a Flemish socialist political party in Belgium. It was founded in 2011 after some members of SP.A, led by Erik De Bruyn, left the Flemish social-democratic party. Red! Supports a social democratic welfare state, and opposes Neoliberalism and the Third Way policies endorsed by the SP.A. The party currently has no parliamentary representatives.

== Party chairmen ==
- 2011–2012: Erik De Bruyn
- 2012–: Stephen Bouquin (spokesperson)
