= Nova Civitas =

Former Flemish think tank

Nova Civitas was a Flemish think tank based on the principles of classic liberalism in combination with Anglo-Saxon conservatism. Nova Civitas claimed at its founding to be completely independent, although it was recognized and supported by the Flemish Liberal Party (VLD). The Founding Chairman of Nova Civitas, Boudewijn Bouckaert, was a long-time board member of the VLD.

According to their website, the basic principles of Nova Civitas were:

- that freedom is linked to responsibility;
- that the family must be revalorized as a cornerstone of a free society;
- that the economy should be de-feodalized, and the free entrepreneurship should be protected;
- that the rule of law must be upheld.

— Nova Civitas website

Nova Civitas was founded in 1992, in the tradition of the Belgian 1980s, Ludwig Von Mises Institute as a new political club to support the rebirth of a strong liberal movement in Belgium dominated by the VLD in Flanders and the Liberal Reformist Party in Wallonia. Nova Civitas was headquartered in Ghent. In 2004, a new regional committee was created in Antwerp, followed in 2006 by one in Brussels.

Nova Civitas opposed the "socialist welfare state" and advocated further transfers of competences from the federal to the regional levels. Nova Civitas also proposed a regrouping of political forces into what would have become a de facto two-party system, with a big centre-right/right-wing political party alliance in Flanders, including VLD, Christen-Democratisch en Vlaams, New Flemish Alliance and Vlaams Belang. At the time, this stirred controversy and several Nova Civitas members were rebuked by the VLD. Senators Hugo Coveliers and Jean-Marie Dedecker were even forced to leave the party in the ensuing turmoil.

In 2007, Nova Civitas member Jean-Marie Dedecker started his own political party, the eponymous List Dedecker (now: Libertarian, Direct, Democratic) and established a new think tank, Cassandra, to serve as the ideological laboratory for his party.

From 2003 to 2009, Nova Civitas granted an annual award: Liberty Prize.

In 2009, both Cassandra and Nova Civitas fell victim of internal disputes, and decided to disband themselves. A new classical liberal think tank, Libera!, replaced Nova Civitas. Libera! grants the annual Prize for Liberty.

== Prize for Liberty ==
From 2003 to 2009, Nova Civitas granted the annual Prize for Liberty. Each laureate was expected to provide a Gustave de Molinari-lecture. Since the 2009, the Liberty Prize was continued by Libera!.

- 2003: Luuk van Middelaar, liberal philosopher and publicist
- 2004: Ayaan Hirsi Ali, Dutch parliament member for the VVD
- 2005: Matthias Storme, professor and liberal theorist
- 2006: Alain Destexhe, Belgian senator for MR
- 2007: Derk Jan Eppink, liberal-conservative journalist
- 2008: Urbanus, comedian and entertainer
- 2009: Mark Grammens, conservative journalist

Awards by Libera!:

- 2010: Frits Bolkestein, Dutch/European politician
- 2011: Theodore Dalrymple, conservative theorist
- 2012: Johan Van Overtveldt, chief editor of Trends
- 2013: Frank van Dun, law philosopher
- 2014: Peter De Keyzer, chief economist BNP Paribas Fortis
- 2015: Jean-Marie Dedecker, founder LDD
- 2016: Fernand Huts, chairman Katoen Natie
- 2017: Hans Bourlon and Gert Verhulst, founders of Studio 100
- 2018: Thierry Baudet, founder of Forum voor Democratie
- 2019: Marc De Vos, founder of the Itinera Institute
- 2020: De Strangers, band from Antwerp
- 2021: Lieven Annemans, health economist
- 2022: Boudewijn Bouckaert, law and economics professor, former President of Libera!
- 2023: Rik Torfs, former rector of the KU Leuven (Katholieke Universiteit Leuven)
- 2024: Mia Doornaert, journalist and columnist
- 2025: Guido Dumarey, industrialist and entrepreneur
- 2026: Ivan Van de Cloot, founder and chief economist of Merito Foundation

== See also ==
- Liberaal Vlaams Verbond
- Liberales
