= Liberal Appeal =

Defunct Belgian political party

The Liberal Appeal (Dutch: Liberaal Appèl, LA) was a Flemish conservative-liberal political party.

Founded on 22 March 2002 by the liberal MEP Ward Beysen (1941-2005) as a secession of the VLD, mostly in Antwerp. The Liberaal Appèl was first a movement, then became a full-fledged political party on 20 January 2003. It took part, with a limited number of votes (less than 0.5%) under the 5% electoral threshold, at the May 2003 federal elections.

On 14 January 2005 Ward Beysen committed suicide, an event that created doubts over the party's future. There were meetings in the following months between the leadership of Liberaal Appèl and another VLD-dissenter, Hugo Coveliers, but to no effect, as Coveliers finally announced his own party VLOTT to break the cordon sanitaire around the Vlaams Belang.

On 7 November 2005 the party's leader, Jacques Kerremans, met his VLD counterpart Bart Somers in view of an electoral cartel for the municipal elections of 8 October 2006, and the reintegration of Liberaal Appèl into the VLD began at the local level.

On 2 February 2007 the party's leader announced that his party will participate at the open alliance of VLD / VIVANT for the general election of June 2007. This is a further step to reintegration into the VLD.
