= Boudewijn Bouckaert =

Belgian politician

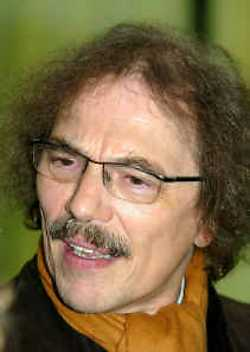
- Born: 21 July 1947 (age 78); Ghent, Belgium
- Occupations: politician, professor

Boudewijn Bouckaert (born 21 July 1947) is a Belgian law professor, a member of the Flemish Movement, and a libertarian conservative thinker and politician. He was a Member of the Flemish Parliament for the liberal party List Dedecker. He is also a former president of the Belgian classical liberal think tanks Nova Civitas, Cassandra and Libera!.

Boudewijn Bouckaert holds a PhD and teaches at the Law School of the University of Ghent, the University of Paris and the University of Aix-Marseille. He is director of the Department of Legal Theory and History at Ghent University and was chairperson of the European Master in Law and Economics program.

He has been lecturer at the Institute for Humane Studies in Fairfax, Virginia, at the Institute for Economic Studies in Paris, France, and also a visitor at Harvard University. He used to sit on the Belgian High Council for Judicial Matters and was chairman of the Land Management Committee. He is also a member of the international free-market group Mont Pelerin Society.

In 2006, Boudewijn Bouckaert succeeded professor Matthias Storme as chairman of the Overlegcentrum van Vlaamse Verenigingen (OVV, or Meeting Association of Flemish Organizations), a flamingant organisation in Belgium.

On 7 June 2007, his pregnant wife Katrien Van den Berghe died in Ghent University Hospital due to a cerebral hemorrhage. Their unborn son Elias could also not be saved.

== VLD ==
Bouckaert was a member of the board of the Flemish Liberals and Democrats (VLD) party. In 2005 he created a stir when he publicly called for an "evolution to the formation of a two-party system after the Anglo-Saxon model." With "two homogenous groups," Bouckaert concluded, "a left-wing bloc around the sp.a, ACV and Groen!, and a right wing bloc with the VLD, the right wing of the CD&V, the N-VA and the Vlaams Belang." His opinions were against the party line, and an agreement within the VLD to not criticize the party line. A conflict ensued between Bouckaert and party chairman Bart Somers, which ended on 8 July 2005, when Bouckaert stepped down from the party board.

After the dismissal of Jean-Marie Dedecker from the VLD, Hugo Coveliers, Dedecker and Boudewijn Bouckaert (and other Nova Civitas members) started negotiations to form a new right wing liberal party. Bouckaert handed in his party resignation on 27 October 2006, stating that the VLD "has become a left-liberal party that leans towards the SP.A." The social democratic Different Socialist Party (SP.A) was a partner of the VLD from 1999 to 2007 in the Verhofstadt I and Verhofstadt II governments. Bouckaert briefly joined the N-VA political party, together with Jean-Marie Dedecker, but sided with Dedecker after his New Flemish Alliance (N-VA) dismissal and List Dedecker foundation.

== Trivia ==
- He delivered the Wieser Memorial Lecture at the 2007 Prague Conference on Political Economy, in April 2007, at the Liberální institut, a Czech free market think tank.
- He was a lecturer at the first and second Liberty Seminar held in Leuven (Belgium) in July 2007 and August 2008.
- Raised Catholic, he considered organized secularism ("vrijzinnigheid") in his student days, but is now a member of Belgium's small Protestant community.
- In 2022 he was awarded the Prize for Liberty by the Flemish classical-liberal think tank Libera!.
