= Mouvement des Citoyens pour le Changement =

Citizens' Movement for Change Mouvement des Citoyens pour le Changement
- President: Gérard Deprez
- Founded: 1998
- Split from: Christian Social Party
- Headquarters: Rue de la Vallée 50-1000, Brussels
- Ideology: Christian democracy Liberal conservatism
- Political position: Centre-right
- National affiliation: Reformist Movement
- European affiliation: European Democratic Party
- Colours: Turquoise
- Chamber of Representatives (French-speaking seats): 1 / 61
- Senate (French-speaking seats): 0 / 24
- Walloon Parliament: 0 / 75
- Parliament of the French Community: 0 / 94
- Brussels Parliament (French-speaking seats): 0 / 72
- European Parliament (French-speaking seats): 0 / 8

Website
- http://www.lemcc.be

Citizens' Movement for Change (French: Mouvement des Citoyens pour le Changement, pronounced [muvmɑ̃ de sitwajɛ̃ puʁ lə ʃɑ̃ʒmɑ̃], MCC) is a Christian-democratic political party in the French Community of Belgium founded by Gérard Deprez in 1998.

Deprez was the leader of the Francophone Christian Social Party (PSC) from 1982 to 1995. He left the PSC, because he had failed to carry through his idea of forging a confederation of the PSC with the Liberal Reformist Party (PRL). Moreover, he had been discontent with the election of Charles-Ferdinand Nothomb as party leader. The last trigger to form a new party was the popular outrage at the government's mishandling of the controversy around the pedophile serial killer Marc Dutroux. The MCC immediately joined the alliance of the PRL and the regionalist Democratic Front of the Francophones (FDF) and ran on a joint PRL-FDF-MCC list for the elections in 1999. Deprez was elected to the European Parliament and sat with the group of the European People's Party (EPP-ED). The MCC supported the "purple-green" government coalition of Liberals, Socialists and Greens, while the PSC, for the first time in 50 years, was sent into opposition. PRL, FDF and MCC became components of the Reformist Movement in 2002.

In the 2004 European Parliamentary Election it elected one MEP (G. Deprez) on the MR ticket. This time, he chose to sit with his liberal allies in the Alliance of Liberals and Democrats for Europe (ALDE) Group. The MCC became part of the pan-European European Democratic Party (EDP).

== See also ==
- Political parties in Belgium
- Politics of Belgium
