= Jean-Marie Dedecker =

Belgian politician, judo coach

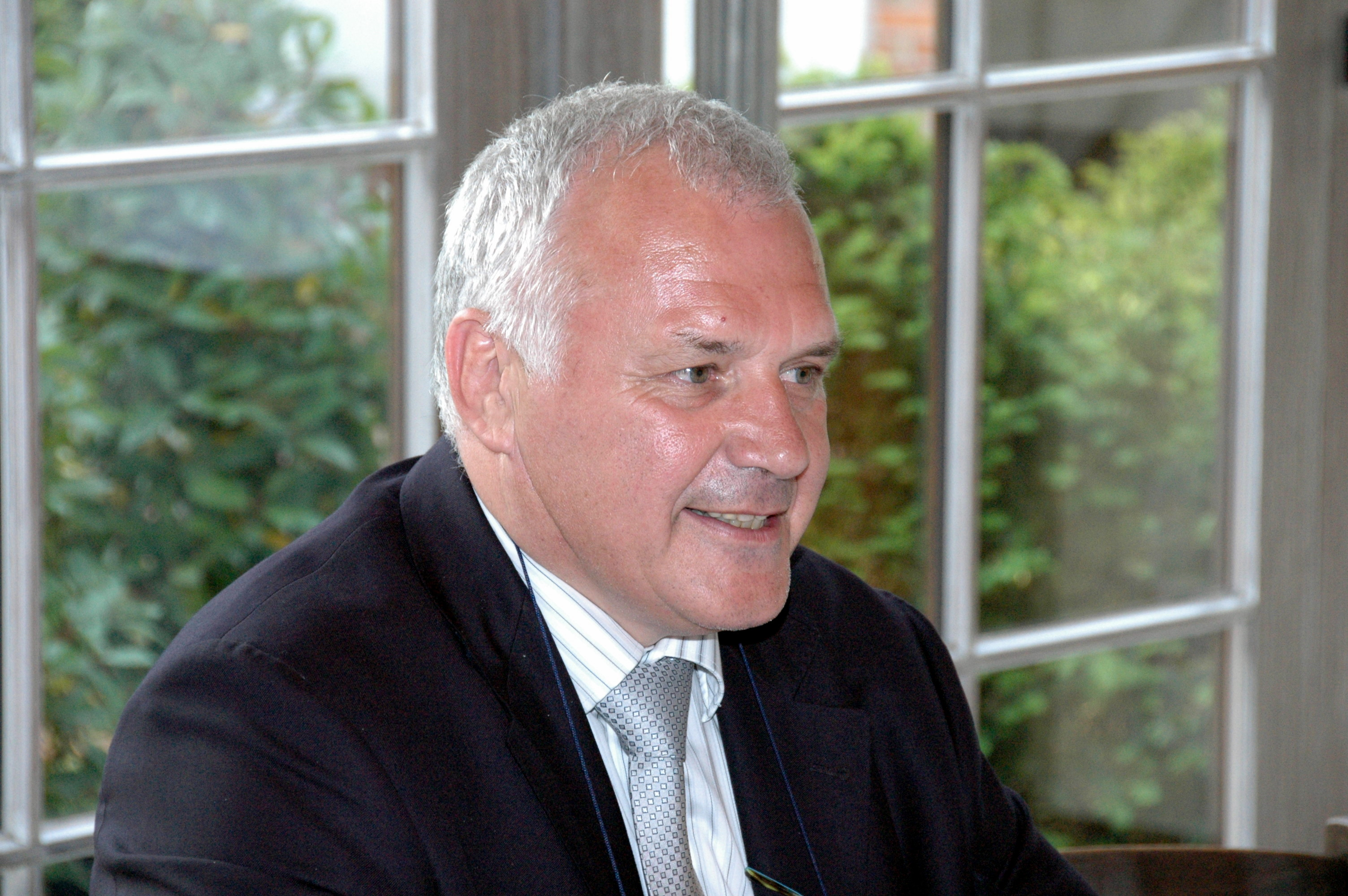
- Dedecker in 2008

Member of the Chamber of Representatives
- Incumbent
- Assumed office 10 June 2019
- In office 12 July 2007 – 30 June 2014

Member of the Belgian Senate
- In office 14 July 1999 – 12 July 2007

Mayor of Middelkerke
- Incumbent
- Assumed office 1 January 2019
- Preceded by: Janna Rommel-Opstaele

Member of the Flemish Parliament
- In office 1 January 2004 – 12 July 2007

Personal details
- Born: Jean-Marie Louis Dedecker; 13 June 1952 (age 73) Nieuwpoort, Belgium
- Party: N-VA (2006; 2019–2025); LDD (2007–present)
- Other political affiliations: Open Vld (1999–2006)
- Spouse: Christine Dehaemers (m. 2015)
- Children: 2
- Website: Personal Website

Jean-Marie Louis Dedecker (born 13 June 1952) is a Belgian politician.

In 1999 and 2003, Dedecker was directly elected to the Belgian Senate for the Flemish Liberals and Democrats (VLD). In 2004, he ran for a seat in the Flemish Parliament, and after taking his seat in the Flemish Parliament, he was elected by his colleagues as a community senator as well. He was expelled from the VLD, and eventually sided with the N-VA party for a brief time in November–December 2006. In January 2007, Dedecker presented his own political party— Lijst Dedecker—that participated in the 2007 general election. Against all expectations, Lijst Dedecker got 5 elected in Parliament, and 1 in Senate.

Dedecker became well-known first for his long career as a judo coach, with his judokas winning for Belgium unprecedented number of medals (among them four times Olympian gold), and then for his politics. In 2004, as a pure outsider, he won 38% of the votes for the VLD party leadership against the party establishment. He was expelled from the VLD though in October 2006.

Within the VLD he was one of the members that favours breaking the cordon sanitaire around the Vlaams Belang.

In 2006, (as VLD member) he published a book, Rechts voor de raap, which became a national best-seller.

In 2015, he was awarded the Prize for Liberty by the Flemish classical-liberal think tank Libera!.

Since 2019, he has been the mayor of Middelkerke. In the 2019 Belgian federal election, he was elected to parliament once again as an independent candidate on the N-VA's list.

== VLD exit ==
The 2006 Belgian municipal elections were lost by the VLD, also in Ostend, where Dedecker was a candidate. In Ostend, they lost out to the Socialist Party (SP.A), for which party president Johan Vande Lanotte was a candidate in the city. In the run-up to the elections, Vande Lanotte and Dedecker clashed severely, with Dedecker claiming that Vande Lanotte, as councilor and socialist party "strong man," made Ostend the "Palermo of the North Sea." The local VLD party in Ostend, led by Bart Tommelein, does want to pursue a city coalition with the Socialist though. Dedecker however stated, on election night, that the VLD with this result cannot be part of any coalition. Two days later, the national head of the VLD, Bart Somers, intervened, by stating that Dedecker will be removed from the VLD. Somers stated that in the last few days Dedecker has showed himself to be a "inveterate trouble maker who keeps on creating damaging battles in his own party." Dedecker responded that "first they use me to attract votes in the local elections, only to put me on the street once the votes have been counted." Bart Tommelein later on accused Dedecker of being "the largest Calimero of Flemish politics."

It was not unlikely that Dedecker would step over to VLOTT, a party being led by Hugo Coveliers. Coveliers was also a VLD member, but was ejected when he clashed with then party head Karel De Gucht. He openly invited Dedecker to start a VLOTT division in West Flanders. In an opinion article for De Standaard Coveliers wrote: "...I predicted I would not be the last one. There were still some independent minds running around that had to be tamed...Jean-Marie Dedecker goes out the same way: the party leader of the SP.A decides that the VLD has to bring a sacrifice, which the VLD executive eagerly fulfills.... They thereby relinquish themselves of a tough contender. These corruptible politicians would simply not allow any criticism.... There is no one left to oppose them now Dedecker is liquidated.... With his liquidation, the VLD merges left, soon to turn left, to the left side of society. Far away from the original liberal voters and principles." Coveliers claims he was ejected from the VLD on command of (then) SP.A leader Steve Stevaert. Some believe the same thing happened to Dedecker, on command of Socialist Party leader Johan Vande Lanotte.

== N-VA entry and exit ==
After being expelled from the VLD Dedecker looked into starting a new liberal party, which might have seen the involvement of Hugo Coveliers of VLOTT, and law professor Boudewijn Bouckaert. He made it clear that he would not join the Vlaams Belang, the largest right wing party of Flanders. In November 2006, Dedecker founded the right-liberal thinkthank Cassandra. On 30 November 2006 it was announced that Dedecker joined the New Flemish Alliance (N-VA) on behalf of the N-VA party board, because it proved difficult in Belgium to meet the electoral threshold of 5% with a new party.

The Christian Democratic and Flemish party (CD&V), with whom the N-VA had an electoral cartel agreement, stated they didn't want to be in league with Dedecker and broke off the association. On 9 December 2006, the N-VA party congress decided they preferred the cartel with CD&V over Dedecker; afterwards Dedecker resigned from the party he joined only ten days earlier.

== Belgian cycling doping affair ==
In September 2006, Dedecker told the press that he had the names of three Belgian cyclists, who went to Italy for illegal doping treatments. In January 2007, Belgian cyclist Johan Museeuw admitted that he took stimulants during the last years of his cycling career, and that he confided this earlier to Dedecker. The newspaper Het Laatste Nieuws claimed on the basis of various accounts of people close to Quick Step-Innergetic manager Patrick Lefevere, that Lefevere has pushed cyclists to use illegal stimulants. Lefevere is now suing Dedecker for €75,000 over his earlier allegations about doping use among Belgian cyclists.

The information Dedecker gave in September 2006 led to house searches throughout Belgium in June 2007 of persons related to cycling. The judiciary found various illegal substances during the search.

== LDD ==
On 3 January 2007, Dedecker announced that he would set up a new political party. On 4 January 2007, Dedecker explained his plans by stating that he wanted to be the Flemish party political equivalent of Geert Wilders and Pim Fortuyn. He called his project a healthy right-wing political formation.

On 6 January, a preparatory meeting was held in Ostend with some sympathizers, including Boudewijn Bouckaert (ex-VLD), former mayor of Ledegem Paul Vanhie, Walter Govaert, former alderman of Keerbergen John Lambrechts (also ex-VLD) and Saïd Bouharrak, a consultant of Belgian- Moroccan descent. Dedecker officially presented his new party on 19 January 2007. In the 2007 Belgian federal election, he was elected to the House of Representatives for his new party. In October 2009 he published the book Headscarf or Blindfold in which he criticized mass migration and advance of Islam in Europe. Following the 2010 Belgian federal election, Dedecker resigned as leader of the LDD and stepped down from national politics.

== Return to politics ==
On 14 October 2018, Dedecker was elected as mayor of Middelkerke. In the 2019 Belgian federal election, he stood for the West Flanders constituency as an independent candidate affiliated to the N-VA's list. He was elected with 40,781 preferential votes and sat as an independent in the Chamber of Representatives. In October 2020, Dedecker stated in an interview that he will resign from parliament as he wanted to give priority to his mayorship.
