= Union des Francophones =

Union of Francophones Union des Francophones
- Chairman: 4 co-chairmen
- Founded: October 1998
- Ideology: Regionalism; Francophone minority interests
- Flemish Parliament: 0 / 124
- Flemish Provincial Councils: 2 / 175

Website
- www.uniondesfrancophones.be

The Union of Francophones (French: Union des Francophones, pronounced [ynjɔ̃ de fʁɑ̃kɔfɔn], UF) is a political party in Belgium that participates as electoral lists in regional, provincial, and municipal elections in the Flemish Province of Flemish Brabant. As its name suggests, its primary target is the French-speaking community of Flemish Brabant and particularly those who live in the officially Dutch-speaking area Halle-Vilvoorde including the now predominantly French-speaking municipalities with language facilities in the Brussels Periphery. Its main goal is to provide both constitutional exemptions for and privileges to Francophones living in Dutch-speaking Flanders, for example by annexing the municipalities with language facilities to the officially bilingual Brussels-Capital Region.

== History ==
In the 1980s the Groupement des francophones de la Périphérie (GFP) was created, grouping French-speaking elected officials from the Flemish communes of the Brabant province. In 1994 the province of Brabant was divided into the Brussels-Capital Region, Flemish Brabant and Walloon Brabant, leading to the creation of the Union of Francophones in the perspective of the October 1994 provincial elections.

== Organization ==
The UF is a cooperative structure without direct members, run by representatives of 4 French-speaking parties, the Reformist Movement (MR), the Francophone Democratic Federalists (a member of MR until 25 September 2011), the Humanist Democratic Centre and the Socialist Party, plus the elected officials at the regional and provincial levels, and the burgomasters. Its general assembly groups all French-speaking elected officials in the Flemish Brabant.

== Programme ==
As a heterogenous multi-party coalition, the UF doesn't follow a specific ideological point of view. However, reflecting the social composition of the population in these rather privileged suburbs, most of the elected officials belong to the centre-right Reform Movement. The coalition wants an enlargement of the bilingual Brussels Capital Region through the merger of various municipalities with language facilities with a large percentage of Francophone inhabitants, like Sint-Genesius-Rode, to it and opposes the splitting of the partially bilingual Brussels-Halle-Vilvoorde electoral and judicial constituency.

== Elected officials ==
The party currently has no representatives in the Flemish Parliament, two in the provincial council of Flemish Brabant and dozens in several municipal councils.

== Other French-speaking parties ==
For the first time the Francophone green party Ecolo took part in some UF lists at the municipal level for the 2006 elections, only in municipalities with language facilities, and got several candidates elected, including an alderman (échevin) in Linkebeek, Franklin Audag. Beforehand the party had always chosen to support the lists of its Flemish counterpart Groen!, with or without the inclusion of an Ecolo candidate. But the party refused to take part in the UF list for the Flemish regional elections in 2009.

== Electoral performance ==
The following table lists the municipalities bordering the Brussels Region and/or bordering one of the six Flemish municipalities with language facilities for French speakers (marked with [F]).

Municipality	2012 provincial council		2014 Flemish Parliament		2018 provincial council		2019 Flemish Parliament	
Municipality	Votes	%	Votes	%	Votes	%	Votes	%
Asse	688	3.6%	453	2.36%	485	2.5%	393	2%
Beersel	3,013	20.4%	2,287	15.40%	2,259	15.2%	1,898	12.8%
Dilbeek	3,083	12.2%	2,004	7.92%	2,655	10.3%	1,570	6.1%
Drogenbos [F]	1,348	55.9%	1,069	45.72%	1,224	50.3%	906	38.1%
Grimbergen	2,491	11.3%	1,499	6.87%	1,604	7.3%	1,057	4.8%
Halle	1,077	4.7%	564	2.44%	662	2.8%	437	1.8%
Hoeilaart	818	13.8%	541	9.06%	417	6.6%	305	4.8%
Kraainem [F]	3,979	64.1%	2,949	50.48%	3,010	52.2%	2,780	46.3%
Linkebeek [F]	1,785	65.8%	1,519	56.87%	1,398	53.1%	1,225	46.2%
Machelen	568	7.4%	370	4.80%	309	3.9%	287	3.6%
Meise	753	6.1%	558	4.49%	516	4.2%	437	3.5%
Merchtem	110	1%	95	0.87%	108	1%	91	0.8%
Overijse	2,710	20.7%	1,826	13.65%	1,578	11.6%	1,292	9.3%
Sint-Genesius-Rode [F]	5,208	54%	4,014	42.21%	4,433	46.9%	4,088	42.1%
Sint-Pieters-Leeuw	3,602	19.6%	2,712	14.78%	2,802	15.2%	2,000	10.9%
Tervuren	1,518	14%	1,256	11.48%	1,171	10.3%	904	7.9%
Vilvoorde	2,512	11.5%	1,669	7.60%	2,001	8.5%	1,101	4.8%
Wemmel [F]	2,950	34.6%	2,246	26.17%	2,309	28%	1581	19.3%
Wezembeek-Oppem [F]	4,497	63.3%	3,058	45.90%	3,708	54.2%	2,907	42.9
Zaventem	3,452	20.7%	2,456	14.97%	3,145	18.5%	2,173	13%
Entire province of Flemish Brabant	48,920	7.1%	34,741	5.01%	38,115	5.4%	28,804	4.1%
