= Vivant =

Social-liberal political party in Belgium

- Leader: Roland Duchâtelet
- Founded: 1995 (as BANAAN); 1998 (as Vivant)
- Split from: ROSSEM (BANAAN)
- Membership (1999): 5,000
- Ideology: Social liberalism Euroscepticism; Basic income Conservative liberalism (German wing)
- Political position: Centre-left
- Colours: Purple
- Chamber of Representatives: 0 / 150
- Senate: 0 / 60
- Parliament of the German-speaking Community: 4 / 25
- European Parliament: 0 / 22

Website
- vivant.org

Vivant is a small social-liberal political party in Belgium founded by millionaire Roland Duchâtelet. In the regional elections in June 2004, the party formed a strategic alliance with the Flemish Liberals and Democrats (VLD). Both parties are founded on the principle of individualism and can be called liberal. In 2007, the party announced it would likely merge with the VLD.

Vivant is economically interventionist, advocating a basic income guarantee for all citizens. Vivant considers the basic income as an inalienable part of the legal minimum wage (approximately half of it for full-time employment). In order to tax goods more evenly, wherever they are manufactured in order to respond to automatisation, globalization and an ageing population, Vivant proposes to shift taxes from labour to final consumption. (All taxes in the chain of production are an inclusive part of the price paid by the consumers and could be considered as a consumption tax, each tax in each stage with its specific side effects.)

Vivant also proposes a flat tax on income in two steps, 0% on to 1350 Euro and 50% from there. The VLD doesn't support all of these measures. Vivant also has direct democracy as one of its key points. The main goal of the party and its universal income proposal, is a creation of an extensive welfare system. The party seeks a "more effective struggle against poverty and exclusion, the end of stigmatizing controls on beneficiaries, and an effective way of suppressing unemployment traps."

In the regional elections of 2004, partner VLD lost heavily, dragging Vivant with it to third place among Flemish political parties. Although interest in Vivant increased during the elections, the party remained a marginal force in Belgian politics. Vivant is particularly strong in the German-speaking community of Belgium, where it won 7.3% and two representatives in the Parliament of the German community.

While vivant means "alive" or "lively" in French, as an acronym "VIVANT" stands for Voor Individuele Vrijheid en Arbeid in een Nieuwe Toekomst, ("for individual freedom and labour in a new future") in Dutch.

== Elections ==
Vivant first took part in the federal elections for the Belgian Senate and Chamber of Representatives in 1999, but obtained no seats. The 2003 elections were no different. In 2004 there were elections of the European Parliament and the Belgian regional parliaments, where Vivant took part in a list-cartel with the VLD, but none of Vivant's candidates were elected. In 2006, Nele Lijnen became a co-opted member of the Senate.

== Election results ==
=== Parliament of the German-speaking Community ===
Election	Votes	%	Seats	+/−	Government
1999	1,228	3.33	0 / 25	New	Extra-parliamentary
2004	2,665	7.34	2 / 25	▲2	Opposition
2009	2,684	7.16	2 / 25	0	Opposition
2014	3,994	10.62	2 / 25	0	Opposition
2019	5,807	14.81	3 / 25	▲1	Opposition
2024	5,700	14.23	4 / 25	▲1	Opposition

=== Flemish Parliament ===
Election	Votes	%	Seats	+/−	Government
1995 (Note: Ran as BANAAN.)	33,701	0.89	0 / 117	New	Extra-parliamentary
1999	77,864	2.01	0 / 117	0	Extra-parliamentary
2004 (Note: Ran as part of the Open VLD coalition.)	804,578	19.79	25 / 117	▲25	Coalition

=== European Parliament ===
Election	List leader	Votes	%					Seats	+/−	EP Group
Election	List leader	Votes	G.E.C.	F.E.C.	D.E.C.	Overall		Seats	+/−	EP Group
1999	Unclear	123,438	3.25 (#6)	2.38 (#6)	1.73 (#7)	1.99	0 / 25	0	−	
2004	Did not contest						0 / 24	0	−	
2009	Josef Meyer	2,417	6.25 (#6)	Did not contest		0.04	0 / 22	0	−	
2014	Andreas Meyer	3,319	8.60 (#6)	Did not contest		0.05	0 / 21	0	−	
2019	Alain Mertes	4,550	11.16 (#6)	Did not contest		0.07	0 / 21	0	−	
2024	Alain Mertes	5,281	12.16 (#4)	Did not contest		0.07	0 / 22	0	−	

== See also ==
- List of liberal parties
- Liberalism in Belgium
