= Hugo Coveliers =

Belgian politician and lawyer

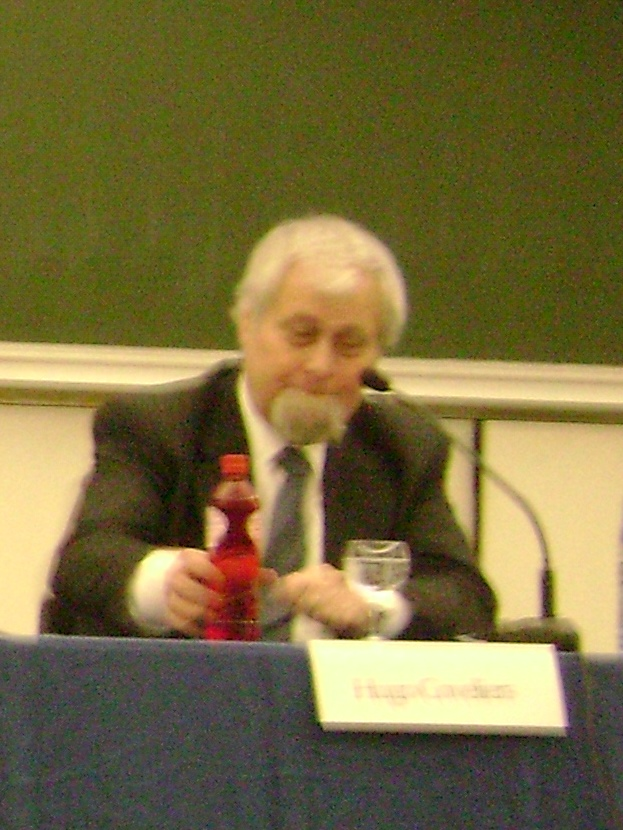

Senator
- In office 2003 – June 2011

Personal details
- Born: 21 February 1947 (age 79) Schelle, Belgium
- Party: Volksunie (1985–1993); Open VLD (1993–2005); VLOTT (2005–2012)
- Website: www.coveliers.be

Hugo F.V. Coveliers (born 21 February 1947) is a retired Belgian politician and lawyer. He was a member of the Belgian Chamber of People's Representatives between 1985 and 1995, and from 1993 to 2003. Since 2003, he has been a member of the Belgian Senate. He was a parliamentary chairman for the VLD in both chambers, from 1999 to 2003.

== Biography ==
Coveliers was born in Schelle, Flemish Community, Belgium, on 21 February 1947. As a student he came into contact with the Flemish Movement. Coveliers became a member of the Young Flemish Student Community and at the University of Ghent he was a member of the Vlaams-Nationale Studentenunie for two years. From his period in the humanities he was involved in the youth section of the People's Union (Volksunie), a Flemish nationalist party, of which he was the chairman from 1974 to 1976. He was also a municipal councilor of Antwerp from 1974 to 1976. From 1976 to 1979, he was chairman of the Volksunie section of the Antwerp district. He later changed to the Flemish Liberals and Democrats (VLD) in 1992, together with some other frustrated party members. Within the VLD, he was part of the conservative wing, and he was open to the idea of working with the Vlaams Belang (Flemish Interest) and its precursor Vlaams Blok (Flemish Bloc), something the VLD's leadership did not support.

In 2004, Coveliers was co-founder of the Antwerp section of the conservative-libertarian organization Nova Civitas and became inspired and influenced by Dutch politician Pim Fortuyn. At that time he also feuded openly with VLD party chairman Karel De Gucht. This resulted in Coveliers being ejected from the party on 8 February 2005, and starting his own political party VLOTT in the fall of 2005, based on Fortuyn's ideas. This party is willing to work together with the Vlaams Belang (VB) and formed a cartel with it for the Antwerp city elections in October 2006.

After the dismissal of Jean-Marie Dedecker from the VLD, Coveliers, Dedecker and Boudewijn Bouckaert (and other Nova Civitas members) started negotiations to form a new right-wing liberal party. Coveliers and members of VLOTT formed a cartel with VB, therefore appearing on VB's lists in the 2007 general election.

Coveliers withdrew from active politics early 2012.

== Books by Coveliers ==
- Securitas Belgica – de rijkswacht is overbodig, Hadewijch, 1989.
- Twee jaar Bendecommissie, een schimmengevecht, on the Nijvel gang investigation, Hadewijch, 1992.
