= VLOTT =

- Leader: Hendrik Boonen
- Founded: 2006
- Preceded by: Groep Coveliers
- Headquarters: National Secretariat; Edelinckstraat 17; BE 2018 Antwerp
- Ideology: Conservative liberalism; Fortuynism; Right-wing populism
- Political position: Right-wing
- Cartel: Vlaams Belang
- Colours: Blue/White

Website
- www.vlott.be

VLOTT was a minor Belgian right-wing liberal and Fortuynist political party. Its title, VLOTT, is an acronym for "Flemish, Liberal, Independent, Tolerant, Transparent" (Vlaams, Liberaal, Onafhankelijk, Tolerant, Transparant). It was founded on 23 November 2005 by ex-Open VLD member Hugo Coveliers. It participated in a list-cartel with the Vlaams Belang in the October 2006 Antwerp municipal elections and in selected provincial, municipal and district elections elsewhere in Flanders. Despite the popularity of their founder in Antwerp (13 623 personal votes, 3rd most popular) the shared effort of the cartel-partners did only result in a small 0.5 percent win, with no extra seat in the city-council. In 2007, VLOTT did not participate in the general elections, but their candidates appeared as independents on the Vlaams Belang ballots. Only founder Hugo Coveliers was elected to the Belgian Senate. After Coveliers withdrawal from active politics early 2012 Vlaams Belang stopped its cooperation with the party.

== Platform ==
The VLOTT party advocates the independence of Flanders. Democracy and individual liberalism are central tenets of its principles. The party opposes multi-culturalism. Many of the party's policies were originally influenced by that of Dutch politician Pim Fortuyn and his Pim Fortuyn List party.
