= 2007–2008 Belgian government formation =

(Belgium) 2007–2011 Belgian political crisis

Timeline
- 2007 elections
  - 2007–2008 government formation
  - Verhofstadt III (interim)
  - Leterme I
  - Van Rompuy I
  - Leterme II
- 2010 elections
  - 2010–2011 government formation
  - Di Rupo I
  - Sixth state reform
See also
- Brussels-Halle-Vilvoorde
- Partition of Belgium
- State reform in Belgium
- Politics of Belgium
- Cabinet of Belgium

The 2007–2008 Belgian government formation followed the general election of 10 June 2007, and comprised a period of negotiation in which the Flemish parties Flemish Liberal Democratic (Open VLD), Christian Democratic and Flemish (CD&V) and New Flemish Alliance (N-VA), and the French-speaking parties Reformist Movement (MR), Democratic Front of Francophones (FDF) and Humanist Democratic Centre (CdH) negotiated to form a government coalition. The negotiations were characterized by the disagreement between the Dutch- and French-speaking parties about the need for and nature of a constitutional reform. According to some, this political conflict could have led to a partition of Belgium.

On November 6, the formation talks became the longest in Belgian history. When the Parliament confirmed the formation of an interim Government, it had been 196 days since the Belgian people had voted out the previous coalition. It was the second longest formation period in European history, after the Dutch record of 208 days in 1977. Talks were interrupted twice by the resignation of the formateur, which left the political parties waiting for a new appointment by the King. Guy Verhofstadt was appointed as mediator on December 3, with the task not only of looking into the formation of a new government, but also of investigating how the government could handle certain urgent policy matters. Pressed by time, and some say by the King, on 19 December, Verhofstadt concluded a deal on a Government and presented it to Parliament on 21 December; on the same day the Ministers took the oath of office.

On Sunday 23 December, the interim Government officially came into office when it was acknowledged by the lower house of Parliament with 97 votes in favour. The transitional period came to an end on March 20, 2008, when Yves Leterme was sworn in as Prime Minister. The new government seemed short-lived as Leterme offered the King his resignation on 15 July 2008. The King refused.

== Conventions ==
After a federal election, the process of government formation starts. This process is based on constitutional convention rather than written law and generally consists of two stages: information and formation. The King consults the presidents of the Chamber of Representatives and the Senate and a number of prominent politicians in order to discuss the election results. Following these meetings, he appoints an informateur.

The informateur has the task of exploring the various possibilities for a new federal government and for examining which parties can form a majority in the Federal Parliament. He also meets with prominent people in various fields to hear their views on what policies the new federal government should pursue. The informateur then reports to the King and advises him about the appointment of a formateur. However, the King can also decide to appoint a second informateur or appoint a royal mediator.

The formateur, who is usually the prospective prime minister is appointed by the King on the basis of the informateur's report. The task of the formateur is to form a new government coalition and lead the negotiations about the government agreement and the composition of the government. If these negotiations succeed, the formateur presents a new federal government to the King.

== Parties involved in the 2007 government formation ==
List of negotiation leaders
| From | Until | Name | Party | Function |
|---|---|---|---|---|
| June 13, 2007 | July 4, 2007 | Didier Reynders | MR | informateur |
| July 5, 2007 | July 15, 2007 | Jean-Luc Dehaene | CD&V | mediator |
| July 15, 2007 | August 23, 2007 | Yves Leterme | CD&V | formateur |
| August 29, 2007 | September 29, 2007 | Herman Van Rompuy | CD&V | explorator |
| September 29, 2007 | December 1, 2007 | Yves Leterme | CD&V | formateur |
| December 4, 2007 | December 17, 2007 | Guy Verhofstadt | VLD | informateur |
| December 17, 2007 | December 23, 2007 | Guy Verhofstadt | VLD | formateur |

List of heads of government
| From | Until | Name | Party | Function |
|---|---|---|---|---|
| July 12, 1999 | June 11, 2007 | Guy Verhofstadt | VLD | Prime Minister (PM) |
| June 11, 2007 | December 23, 2007 | Guy Verhofstadt | VLD | resigning PM |
| December 23, 2007 | March 20, 2008 | Guy Verhofstadt | VLD | Prime Minister (PM) |
| March 20, 2008 | December 30, 2008 | Yves Leterme | CD&V | Prime Minister (PM) |

- Armand De Decker (MR), President of the Senate, was asked by the King to start an inter-community dialogue together with Herman Van Rompuy.
- Bart De Wever, leader of the New Flemish Alliance (Flemish nationalist).
- Yves Leterme, frontman of the CD&V, has been appointed formateur twice by the King.
- Olivier Maingain, leader of the FDF (Walloon nationalist).
- Joëlle Milquet, leader of the Walloon Christian Democratic party (CDH). (nicknamed Madame Non by the Flemish press)
- Didier Reynders, leader of the Walloon Liberal party (MR), has been appointed informateur.
- Bart Somers, leader of the Flemish Liberal party (Open VLD).
- Jo Vandeurzen, leader of the Flemish Christian Democratic party (CD&V).
- Herman Van Rompuy (CD&V), President of the Chamber of Representatives, was appointed explorator after the first failure of the formateur and was later asked by the King to start a communitarian dialogue together with Armand De Decker.
- Guy Verhofstadt (Open VLD), Prime Minister of Belgium, was appointed informateur on December 3, 2007, and formateur of an interim government on December 17, 2007.

== Election and immediate aftermath, 10 – 13 June ==
On June 10, federal elections were held in Belgium. In Flanders, the ruling purple coalition – the liberal Open VLD and the centre-left electoral list of Socialist Party – Different (SP.a) and Spirit – lost the most seats, while the electoral coalition CD&V/N-VA gained the most and the CD&V became the largest party in Flanders and Belgium. The CD&V/N-VA had an electoral program that emphasized the need for far-reaching state reform. Yves Leterme of the CD&V personally gained 800,000 votes and was considered to be the prospective prime minister. The SP.a, the party that lost the most seats, declared it would prepare itself for a role in the opposition, and would support state reform from that position.

In the French-speaking part of Belgium, the liberal party MR lost some seats but nevertheless became the largest party and replaced the Socialist Party (PS) as the dominant party for the first time in history. Before he was appointed informateur, Didier Reynders, the MR party leader, indicated his preference for a coalition of Christian Democratic parties CD&V (Flanders) and CDH (Wallonia) and liberal parties MR (Wallonia) and Open VLD (Flanders) and noted the fact that the PS was no longer the largest francophone party "a state reform in itself". Reynders also emphasized that the MR was the largest political party of the largest political group, as the combined number of seats of liberals in Flanders and French-speaking Belgium (MR + Open VLD) surpassed the combined number of seats of the Christian-democrats (CD&V + CDH).

== First information round, 13 June – 4 July ==
On 13 June 2007, King Albert II appointed Reynders as informateur. The CD&V/N-VA caused a minor controversy when they immediately agreed with Reynders to stall constitutional reform until after the coinciding regional and European elections of 2009.

Reynders presented his 170-page final report, titled Develop, unite and protect, to the king on 4 July 2007. It included a list of a record-breaking 450 people he talked to as informateur and contained an inventory of their views. Reynders talked to, among others, Guy Quaden, the Governor of the National Bank of Belgium, Joaquín Almunia, the European Commissioner for Economic & Financial Affairs, Herman De Croo, Anne-Marie Lizin, the leaders of trade unions and employers' organisations and several senior civil servants.

== Mediation round, 5 – 15 July ==
Following the informateur's report, King Albert II on July 5 asked former Prime Minister Jean-Luc Dehaene to accept a "mediation and negotiation assignment" in order to prepare the ground for the formateur and to look into the possibility of state reform. Dehaene reached the conclusion that only an orange-blue coalition with CD&V/N-VA, OpenVLD, MR and Humanist Democratic Centre was viable.

Initially Dehaene stated there should be a formateur by July 21, the Belgian national holiday, but he ended his assignment prematurely on Sunday July 15, one week before the July 21 deadline. The former mediator said the four orange-blue parties would accept an invitation to coalition talks, but that this did not "mean all obstacles have been removed, far from it!"

== First formation round, 15 July – 23 August ==
=== Leterme begins his mission ===
The King then appointed Yves Leterme as formateur on Sunday July 15 with the task of forming a new government coalition after Jean-Luc Dehaene was relieved from his task as mediator and negotiator. On his first day as formateur, Leterme met with outgoing Prime Minister Guy Verhofstadt (Open VLD), the new President of the Chamber of Representatives, Herman Van Rompuy (CD&V), and the new President of the Senate, Armand De Decker (MR). The following day, Tuesday July 17, Leterme received the presidents of the orange-blue parties: Jo Vandeurzen (CD&V), Bart De Wever (N-VA), Didier Reynders (MR), Bart Somers (Open VLD) and Joëlle Milquet (Humanist Democratic Centre).

On Monday July 23, Formateur Leterme presented his formation memorandum called The Power of People – Turning Challenges Into Opportunities Together. This formation memorandum formed the basis for the real negotiations. It contained 80 pages and nine chapters about various issues; however, it did not contain a separate chapter on constitutional reform and devolution. In his memorandum, Leterme proposed lowering income taxes for those with low and median incomes, changing the unemployment benefits system, and expanding parental leave. He also wanted to keep several nuclear power stations open longer, build 1,500 additional prison cells, and establish an emergency budget for the FPS Justice to hire more people. The formateur did not want a collective regularisation of illegal immigrants, but proposed the establishment criteria to allow regularisation in individual cases.

=== Suspension of negotiations and consultations by the King ===
Coalition talks at Valley of the Duchess proceeded with much difficulty due to differences between Flemish and Francophone parties over constitutional reform, with communitarian tensions reaching a high on Thursday August 16. Negotiator for Humanist Democratic Centre Francis Delpérée described the situation with the following words: "Il y a un parfum de crise" (English: There is a whiff of crisis). Formal negotiations were temporarily suspended on Friday August 17, following a meeting between the King and the formateur, to allow the King to conduct a series of political consultations. It was the third time since he was appointed formateur that Leterme reported to the King on the progress of the coalition talks. This move was heavily criticised by Johan Vande Lanotte, the outgoing chairman of the Flemish socialist party SP.A and a professor in constitutional law, who accused the parties involved in the coalition talks of forcing the King, who is supposed to remain impartial, to play a political role.

That evening, the King received Jo Vandeurzen, the CD&V chairman, and Didier Reynders, the chairman of the MR. The next day the King received the chairpersons of the two other orange-blue parties, Bart Somers (Open Vld) and Joëlle Milquet (CDH), in order to attempt to defuse the tensions. The King did not receive the chairmen of the N-VA and the FDF; however, Bart De Wever (N-VA) reportedly did receive an exploratory phone call from the Royal Palace. During the weekend, there also were informal consultations between the formateur and all other parties involved in the coalition talks.

=== Leterme resumes his mission and resigns ===
On Sunday August 19, the formateur Leterme was summoned by the King to discuss his consultations. Afterwards, the King asked him to resume his work as formateur, but asked him to make new political contacts before resuming the negotiations. After further negotiations produced no results, Leterme resigned as formateur on August 23.

== Consultations by the King, 23 – 29 August ==
Following Yves Leterme's resignation, King Albert asked Didier Reynders, the chairman of the Francophone liberal party MR and erstwhile informateur, to seek a way out of the stalemate. At first, the Vlaamse Radio- en Televisieomroep (VRT) reported that Philippe Maystadt or Melchior Wathelet would probably take over, either as informateur or as royal mediator. The Flemish parties felt it was up to a member of CDH to take an initiative; however, the CDH wanted a Flemish politician to be involved in the mediation efforts as well. It was later reported that, according to observers, King Albert would probably ask Raymond Langendries (CDH) and Herman De Croo (Open Vld) to mediate.

On August 24, a survey conducted by VTM showed that 45.8% of the 1300 Flemings polled wanted Flanders to be declared independent and that 54.2% opposed such an action. The same survey showed that 58% of the respondents thought that the state reform is worth a crisis. Also, 72% could not understand the French-speaking opposition, and 53% thought that Milquet was to blame for the crisis and 15% thought that Leterme was to blame.

On August 25, the King received Herman Van Rompuy (CD&V), President of the Chamber of Representatives and Armand De Decker (MR), President of the Senate, and on August 27 the Royal Palace announced that the King would receive several ministers of State to discuss the political crisis. It was suggested by De Standaard that the King would not appoint the duo Langendries and De Croo because they were already named too much in the media which caused several politicians, such as Hendrik Bogaert (CD&V) and Bart De Wever (N-VA), to object or criticize such a choice. The Open VLD also held a press conference in which Bart Somers called the remarks about De Croo "inconvenient and unseen". He also said that the problem of the Brussels-Halle-Vilvoorde (BHV) electoral district should be tackled before all other issues, something regarded by the VRT as a direct criticism of Leterme because he did not once mention this problem when he was formateur. Minister of Foreign Affairs Karel De Gucht, who is a negotiator for Open VLD in the coalition talks, described the government formation as "surrealistic" and added: "Ceci n'est pas une formation".

Jean-Luc Dehaene, Wilfried Martens and Philippe Moureaux were the first ministers of State to be received by the King. A photographer took a picture of a document Dehaene had with him when he arrived at the palace. The document reportedly stated that the state reform should not be an issue during the formation whereas the issue of Brussels-Halle-Vilvoorde should be included in a coalition agreement, and that all elections (federal, regional and European) should coincide in 2009. On Tuesday August 28, King Albert received Willy Claes (SP.A), Gérard Deprez (MR), Jos Geysels (Groen!), Philippe Busquin (PS), Charles-Ferdinand Nothomb (Humanist Democratic Centre) and José Daras (Ecolo). The following day, the King received three more ministers of State: Raymond Langendries (Humanist Democratic Centre), Herman De Croo (Open VLD) and Louis Michel (MR).

== Exploratory round, 29 August – 29 September ==
=== Van Rompuy begins his mission ===
Following consultations with a number of ministers of State, King Albert received Herman Van Rompuy (CD&V), the outgoing President of the Chamber of Representatives, and charged him with an exploratory mission in order to find a solution to the political crisis. Van Rompuy was considered by Flemish and French-speaking parties and newspapers as a good choice. He met on August 30 with the presidents of several parties of the orange-blue coalition, in particular Jo Vandeurzen (CD&V), Bart De Wever (N-VA), Bart Somers (Open VLD) and Jöelle Milquet (CDH). On August 31, he met with presidents Didier Reynders (MR), Olivier Maingain, (FDF) and Jean-Michel Javaux (Ecolo). The content of the discussions is unknown as Van Rompuy wanted to communicate and negotiate discreetly. De Standaard noted that Van Rompuy did not talk with a member of the PS, which could mean he wanted to reach the required two-thirds majority for constitutional reform with the ecologists (Ecolo on the French-speaking side) and rather that the PS.

Also on August 30, the Walloon government held its first meeting since the summer holidays. Rudy Demotte (PS), the minister-president of the Walloon government criticized the long duration of the government formation and was skeptical about whether Van Rompuy would be able to solve the crisis. He also said that he was waiting for formation proposals. On August 31, Milquet said institutional reform was less important than other topics and all French-speaking parties should formulate a common strategy. She also expressed her wish to replace the current "confrontational federalism" with a modern "cooperative federalism". Gérard Deprez (MCC, a part of the MR just like the FDF) criticized Maingain's (FDF) demand for the territorial expansion of the region of Brussels to several Flemish towns in return for the split of the BHV electoral district. Deprez said in La Libre Belgique that "Maingain acts like the Inquisition and excommunicates everyone that does not share his dogmas".

In an international press meeting, the Flemish nationalist party Vlaams Belang said that the formation crisis was an example of Belgium's failure to function as a state and that the time had come to declare Flemish independence. On September 1, the Flemish newspaper De Standaard devoted an issue to the question of whether a Flemish secession was realistic and viable. On September 2, during De Gordel, an annual Flemish cycling event in the periphery of Brussels with a strong political undertone, Eric Van Rompuy (member of the CD&V and the brother of explorateur Herman) and Bart De Wever (N-VA) emphasized that this should be the last De Gordel in which the problems surrounding the BHV were not solved. Flemish minister Geert Bourgeois (N-VA) also stated that the Flemish majority in the newly elected parliament should urgently solve the problem unilaterally – i.e. without the consent of the French speaking parties and thus without any offers. Other politicians, such as Flemish minister-president Kris Peeters (CD&V) and federal minister of Internal Affairs Patrick Dewael (Open VLD) participated in the event, but did not comment on BHV. Prominent absentees were Yves Leterme and Guy Verhofstadt.

=== Non-participation of Ecolo ===
During this period, speculation about the participation of the French-speaking ecologist party Ecolo in the orange-blue coalition increased. Van Rompuy tried to obtain the support of Ecolo for the coalition to address left-winged CDH's desire to have a left-wing partner in the centre-right coalition.

On September 3, Ecolo said that three conditions must be met for it to participate in a coalition. First, the party refused to join any coalition involving N-VA. A coalition without the N-VA would "respect the different communities" of Belgium. Second, Groen!, the Flemish ecologists would have to be part of the coalition as well. Third, formation would have to be renegotiated to give the climate change a central place in the coalition programme.

CD&V/N-VA said Ecolo's demands could not "be taken seriously" because the CD&V without the N-VA was unthinkable. They also said the presence of N-VA was not a problem, but that the problem is the unreasonableness of the French-speaking parties to negotiate around the Flemish demands. Groen! said it was unwilling to participate in a coalition in which it is not necessary to obtain a majority in parliament. The need to undertake the negotiations again also meant the agreement between the partners about the prolonged existence of several nuclear power plants had to be reconsidered.

Herman Van Rompuy provided the King a first interim report on September 3. Although his effort to include Ecolo in the coalition failed, Van Rompuy continued his mission despite a general decline in optimism about his likelihood of success of his mission steeply declined. He formulated several proposals that he suggested to the orange-blue parties. On 10 September, Van Rompuy provided the King with a second "interim" report – something that indicated his work would be prolonged.

=== Plenary session of the Flemish parliament ===
Filip Dewinter of the Vlaams Belang proposed to have an earlier plenary session in the Flemish parliament to discuss the communitarian crisis, a request that was granted. On September 10, under the eyes of the international media, he proposed in the plenary session to prepare a plan for an independent Flanders and to hold a referendum on independence. He said that the Flemish resolutions agreed upon in the Flemish parliament in 1999 (that supported a far-reaching devolution of powers) were a breaking point. He also called Belgium "a country that is terminally ill" and that it was time to say "bye bye Belgium".

Other parties vehemently opposed the course of action, proposed by Dewinter. For instance, Ludwig Caluwé (CD&V) said that the Flemish Interest did not vote for the resolutions in 1999. He added that more power to the regions does not imply the end of inter-regional solidarity. Patrcia Ceysens (Open VLD) said that "the country is not going to split, the parliament is not going to declare independence."

=== Leterme's controversial remark ===
In Karrewiet, a Flemish news program for children, Leterme was interviewed. He said "We could make sure that they [French-speaking Belgium] could build schools more cheaply. That would be beneficial for students from Wallonia and Brussels. Maybe if we could agree about that, French-speakers would be willing to negotiate about our demands."

French-speaking politicians and the French-speaking media were enraged about Leterme's remark. Marie Arena (PS) and Joëlle Milquet (CDH) interpreted Leterme's remark as making the Flemish youth believe Walloon parties are only interested in money and could be bribed. They also said that the lower VAT for building schools was already agreed upon in a six-year-old accord which was still not executed. Milquet said that Leterme should refrain from giving interviews.

Wilfried Martens (CD&V) criticized the French-speaking side of the country for misinterpreting a "sign of goodwill" made by Leterme. Karel de Gucht (Open VLD) said that they do not have a veto right about which Fleming can become prime minister. He also added that they overreacted. "Who takes away his position as prime minister, turns him into a political martyr. I do not feel like competing against a political martyr during the next election. Why should he not be allowed to speak? The campaign waged against him...is unacceptable."

=== Criticism on the duration of negotiations ===
Guy Quaden, president of the National Bank of Belgium, warned on September 13 that the long duration of negotiations were not without a price as much-needed measures in the domains of budget, competition and employment are still not taken. Didier Reynders said that Quaden should occupy himself with "interest rates, not politics". CDH agreed with Quaden. CD&V and Open-VLD also agreed, but said that a good agreement was better than a quick but bad agreement.

Elio Di Rupo, the president of the PS, sharply criticized the duration of the negotiations. "Three months on from the election, they're not even sitting around the negotiation table. This has never happened before". He continued, "If we would have participated in the talks, negotiations would never have been derailed". Di Rupo also called the talks a "guerrilla war" rather than negotiations.

Belgian Minister of State Louis Tobback and Trends journalist Geert Noels blamed the Euro for allowing the formation talks to last this long. Since the Belgian government is no longer in charge of its own monetary policy, the value of the currency will not be affected by this political crisis, so there is no monetary incentive to force the formation partners to find a quick solution.

=== No participation of the PS ===
On August 31, the magazine Knack reported that talks were taking place to include the francophone Socialist Party (PS) in a tripartite coalition. This was denied by Di Rupo, whilst Didier Reynders absolutely ruled out the MR joining a coalition with the PS. Rumours continued until September 7 when Van Rompuy denied any negotiations on extending the Orange-Blue coalition to include the PS.

On September 14, Jean-Jacques Viseur (CDH), mayor of Charleroi, said that it was wrong to keep the socialists out of the government. On September 16, Open VLD senator Patrik Vankrunkelsven agreed and openly questioned his party's opposition to the participation of the socialists in government. He said that as long as the PS is an opposition party, the MR will not make any concessions on state reform.

On September 17, it was revealed that Van Rompuy had used Jean-Luc Dehaene to contact the PS secretly a week earlier. Dehaene met Elio Di Rupo and enquired as to whether the PS would support some parts of a state reform from opposition, as the SP.a has said it will. Di Rupo declined to support reforms as long as the PS is not a member of the coalition.

=== Larger role for Van Rompuy ===
Van Rompuy's discretion was appreciated in French-speaking Belgium. MR and CDH proposed that Van Rompuy would include issues such as the federal budget, justice and social-economic matters in his exploratory mandate. Until then, Van Rompuy only tried to determine communitarian issues ranging from the BHV to the regionalisation of power. Van Rompuy's spokesman said that such a widening of his mandate was not being considered.

Open VLD and CD&V supported the French-speaking proposal. CD&V added that a widening of his role can only happen if Van Rompuy remains an explorer, does not become a formateur and does not negotiate. Jo Vandeurzen (CD&V) also emphasized that Leterme remains the prime minister designate. VLD responded that they did not have any intention to undermine the position of Leterme.

== Second formation round, 29 September – 1 December ==
On September 29, Herman Van Rompuy presented his final report to the King. Afterwards, the Royal Palace announced that King Albert II relieved him of his exploratory mission. Later that day, King Albert II again appointed Yves Leterme as formateur. On Friday, 5 October, Leterme provided the King his first interim report, after which negotiations with all orange-blue parties began.

=== Voting about Brussels-Halle-Vilvoorde ===
Talks for a new government were interrupted on November 7, with agreements about everything not related to strengthening Flanders, Wallonia and Brussels; or to monetary affairs. Chairman Pieter De Crem (Christian Democratic and Flemish) of the Belgian Chamber Committee on the Interior had decided to go ahead with a vote on the split of electoral district Brussels-Halle-Vilvoorde. The six Francophone committee members walked out in protest. The 11 Dutch-speaking members continued the meeting, and voted in favour of the split, with only Tinne Van der Straeten (Groen!) abstaining.

The Francophone parties subsequently invoked a procedure known as the conflict of interest (Dutch: belangenconflict, French: conflit d'intérêt), a procedure whereby a regional parliament can indicate that it feels that the interests of the region are hurt by the decision of another political body in Belgium, in this case the Belgian Chamber Committee on the Interior. The Parliament of the French Community of Belgium approved the procedure on November 9, with three members of the National Front abstaining. This suspends a decision about Brussels-Halle-Vilvoorde for a period of 60 days.

=== The King intervenes ===
On November 9, King Albert II intervened. He took state reform off the agenda for the negotiations, and instructed the chairmen of the Chamber of Representatives and the Senate to "start a dialogue" on the matter. In a joint statement, the parties CD&V and N-VA rejected the decision, and stated they would only join a government if there were "guarantees for big state reform."

On November 12, the King met with the chairmen of the socialist parties SP.A and PS, and the green parties Groen! and Ecolo, who would be part of the opposition if the orange-blue government were to be formed. The purpose of the meeting was to see whether the parties were willing to take part in a Committee of Wise Men that would examine the possibilities for state reform. SP.A chairwoman Caroline Gennez declined the offer, saying it was not the job of her party to make an orange-blue government possible. She called the Council of Wise Men "not a way towards a solution to state reform, but a getaway route to nowhere." Mieke Vogels, chairwoman of Groen!, stated her party would not give the new government a "blank check" for state reform. Chairman Elio Di Rupo of the PS said he wanted to see the "menu" of the Committee of Wise Men first; "without a serious menu, [the Committee of Wise Men] risks becoming a talking shop."

The next day, the King met with the chairmen of CD&V, CDH, Open VLD and MR, and with Chamber of Representatives chairman Herman Van Rompuy (CD&V) and Senate chairman Armand De Decker (MR), to discuss ways to start dialogue on state reform.

CD&V's partner party in the negotiations, N-VA, was not invited, nor was FDF, which is affiliated with MR. The chairmen of right-wing parties Flemish Interest, List Dedecker and FN – who would be in opposition if the orange-blue government was to be formed – were not invited either.

One of the instructions the King had given to De Decker and Van Rompuy, was to find a way to start a dialogue on state reform. In an interview with RTBF on November 14, Armand De Decker said he and Karel Van Rompuy wanted to establish a National Committee of Dialogue (French: Collège national pour le dialogue, Dutch: Nationaal College van Dialoog). The committee would consist of prominent politicians of the Christian-democratic, liberal, socialist and green parties, who together have a two-thirds majority in both the Chamber of Representatives and the Senate. Van Rompuy stated that nothing had been agreed upon, and that De Decker had spoken in his own name.

=== Negotiations at a standstill ===
While the King was trying to find a new way to hold negotiations between the parties involved, the negotiations themselves came to a standstill. The parties have not spoken with each other since November 8, and the Francophone parties have stated that they would only rejoin the negotiating table if the Flemish parties apologize for the Chamber Committee on the Interior vote on Brussels-Halle-Vilvoorde.

Several politicians had suggested a tripartite government of liberal, Christian-democratic and socialist parties. The newspapers Gazet van Antwerpen and Het Belang van Limburg reported on November 13 that the CD&V was leaning towards that option as well. Party spokesman Peter Poulussen denounced the reports as "pure speculation," and Open VLD and MR rejected the idea of a tripartite government.

Bruno De Wever, professor at the Ghent University and brother of N-VA chairman Bart De Wever on 17 November stated on Kanaal Z, a Flemish business television channel, that "a periphery around Brussels where 80% speaks French, is not Flemish." He said that a compromise should be worked with an increase in social and economic competences for Flanders in exchange for the expansion of the bilingual Brussels-Capital Region. Bruno De Wever also said that it is hard to continue to call a municipality where a large majority of the population speaks French a Flemish municipality.

=== Mayors of Kraainem, Linkebeek and Wezembeek-Oppem ===
Flemish Interior Minister Marino Keulen (Open VLD) announced on November 14 that he had decided not to appoint the French-speaking mayors of Kraainem, Linkebeek and Wezembeek-Oppem, three municipalities with linguistic facilities in the Flemish Periphery of Brussels, because they had sent letters of convocation (letters calling citizens to vote and informing them where their polling station is) in French for the 2006 municipal elections and the 2007 federal election. This was a violation of rules established by the Flemish Government. The three mayors are all members of the FDF. Marino Keulen will ask the municipal councils of these municipalities to nominate a new mayor for appointment.

The three mayors also violated language legislation by allowing French to be spoken during the meetings of the municipal councils of Kraainem, Linkebeek and Wezembeek-Oppem on Monday 22 October 2007, which Minister Marino Keulen described as a provocation.

Myriam Delacroix-Rolin (CDH), the Mayor of Sint-Genesius-Rode, another municipality with linguistic facilities, will be appointed; her municipality had only sent letters of convocation in French for the 2006 municipal elections.

The Francophone political parties put forth a united declaration in the Walloon parliament on November 16, calling the act by Flemish minister Keulen "a rejection of democracy." The appointment of the mayors should be seen in the broader perspective of the Brussels' periphery, the declaration stated. Damien Thiery, the Mayor of Linkebeek, announced the following day that he will again be presented for appointment as Mayor.

=== Resignation of Leterme ===
A confused week of negotiations started on 26 November 2007 with an agreement proposed by Yves Leterme and immediately accepted by CDH, MR, FDF and OpenVLD. Ironically, his own close partner N-VA did not accept the agreement, requesting more concessions for government reforms in the agreement instead; this led to a week of back and forth statements and interviews in the media.

On 30 November 2007, Leterme made a final proposal with three questions; he requested positive responses to all questions by all parties in order to continue negotiations. The questions were:

- Are all topics admissible to be discussed in the special commission for state reform?
- Will the regions be given more leeway in regulating business tax rates?
- Can law proposals for state reform be adopted by any constitutional two-thirds majority, without extra conditions, as well?

The French-speaking party CDH gave no response to all three questions, and FDF did not accept the transfer of business tax regulations to the regions. Faced with this defeat, on 1 December 2007 Leterme gave his resignation as formateur to the King, which the King accepted.

== Consultations by the King, 1 – 3 December ==
Guy Verhofstadt, who remains the head of government, was received by the King on 1 December. He was one of many politicians who could be asked by the King to try to seek a new consensus between Dutch and French-speaking parties. After visiting the royal palace twice on 3 December, prime minister Verhofstadt was nominated informateur by the King, although with a smaller role than an informateur usually plays. Verhofstadt stated he was hesitant at first to accept the job.

== Second information round, 4 – 17 December ==
Verhofstadt started his information round on December 4, talking to the chairmen of the Belgian Senate and Chamber of Representatives, Herman Van Rompuy and Armand De Decker respectively. The chairman have already been given the task by the Belgian King to organize a convention on constitutional reform, with members from the Belgian political class. Verhofstadt also met with the leaders of the largest political parties, followed by the smaller political parties on December 5. The main political parties have not ruled out a tripartite coalition, although Verhofstadt's own party, Open VLD, has come out against such arrangement. List Dedecker has declared it will not support Verhofstadt's endeavours, and wants to see new elections instead. Vlaams Belang and the Front National were not invited by Verhofstadt.

There were several difficulties associated with forming a temporary government. On the French-speaking side, the MR opposed a government that included all French-speaking parties. On the Flemish side, the VLD opposed the participation of the SP.a, the Flemish socialist party.

== Forming interim government, 17 December – 23 December ==
On 17 December, Guy Verhofstadt was asked by the King to start the formation of an "interim government" that would last until 23 March 2008. On the morning of 18 December, Verhofstadt met with CDH head Joëlle Milquet and offered the party a part in an interim Government through a person outside the party, a move that confirmed the refusal by MR to a full participation of cdH in the interim Government. In reaction, CDH called a party meeting, soon followed by a press conference where cdH announced its withdrawal from formation talks. The move was followed in the afternoon by a call for francophone unity by PS head Elio Di Rupo that announced it will not take part in a Government without CDH. Later in the afternoon, CD&V head Jo Vandeurzen and Yves Leterme requested a meeting with Verhofstadt where they call for an inclusion of CDH in the coalition. MR thus remained the only party opposing a deal that would include CDH, Verhofstadt decided to meet with Milquet again in the evening and bring back his morning proposal of a participation of CDH in the Government through an external actor, but added that this Minister would have the rank though not the title of Deputy Prime Minister. Milquet and her party met and agreed on this proposal.

In the early hours of 19 December, Belga News Agency announced a deal had been struck by all parties and an interim Government was to be formed by 21 December and approved by Parliament by 23 December. Later in the day, it was confirmed Guy Verhofstadt would address the Parliament on 21 December with a General Policy Declaration. It was also announced the legal 48-hour delay following the declaration would lead the Parliament to vote its confidence to the interim Government on 23 December. The interim Government officially came into office when it was acknowledged by the lower house of Parliament with 97 votes in favour, 46 against on Sunday 23 December 2007.

== See also ==
- 2007–2011 Belgian political crisis
- Partition of Belgium
- Belgian general election, 2007
- State reform in Belgium
- 2010–2011 Belgian government formation
