= 2007 Belgian federal election =

- 10 June 2007
- Turnout: 91.08%
- Chamber of Representatives
- All 150 seats in the Chamber of Representatives; 76 seats needed for a majority
Party	Leader	Vote %	Seats	+/–
CD&V–N-VA	Yves Leterme	18.51	30	+8
MR	Didier Reynders	12.52	23	−1
Vlaams Belang	Frank Vanhecke	11.99	17	−1
Open Vld	Guy Verhofstadt	11.83	18	−7
PS	Elio Di Rupo	10.86	20	−5
sp.a–spirit	Johan Vande Lanotte	10.26	14	−9
cdH	Joëlle Milquet	6.06	10	+2
Ecolo	Jean-Michel Javaux; Isabelle Durant	5.10	8	+4
Lijst Dedecker	Jean-Marie Dedecker	4.03	5	New
Groen	Vera Dua	3.98	4	+4
FN	Daniel Féret	1.97	1	0
This lists parties that won seats. See the complete results below.
- Senate
- 40 of the 71 seats in the Senate
Party	Vote %	Seats	+/–
CD&V–N-VA	19.42	9	+3
Open Vld	12.40	5	−2
MR	12.31	6	+1
Vlaams Belang	11.89	5	0
PS	10.24	4	−2
sp.a–spirit	10.04	4	−3
cdH	5.90	2	0
Ecolo	5.82	2	+1
Groen	3.64	1	+1
Lijst Dedecker	3.38	5	New
FN	2.27	1	0
This lists parties that won seats. See the complete results below.

Federal Government before	Federal Government after
Verhofstadt II Government	Verhofstadt III Government (interim)

(Belgium) 2007–2011 Belgian political crisis

Timeline
- 2007 elections
  - 2007–2008 government formation
  - Verhofstadt III (interim)
  - Leterme I
  - Van Rompuy I
  - Leterme II
- 2010 elections
  - 2010–2011 government formation
  - Di Rupo I
  - Sixth state reform
See also
- Brussels-Halle-Vilvoorde
- Partition of Belgium
- State reform in Belgium
- Politics of Belgium
- Cabinet of Belgium

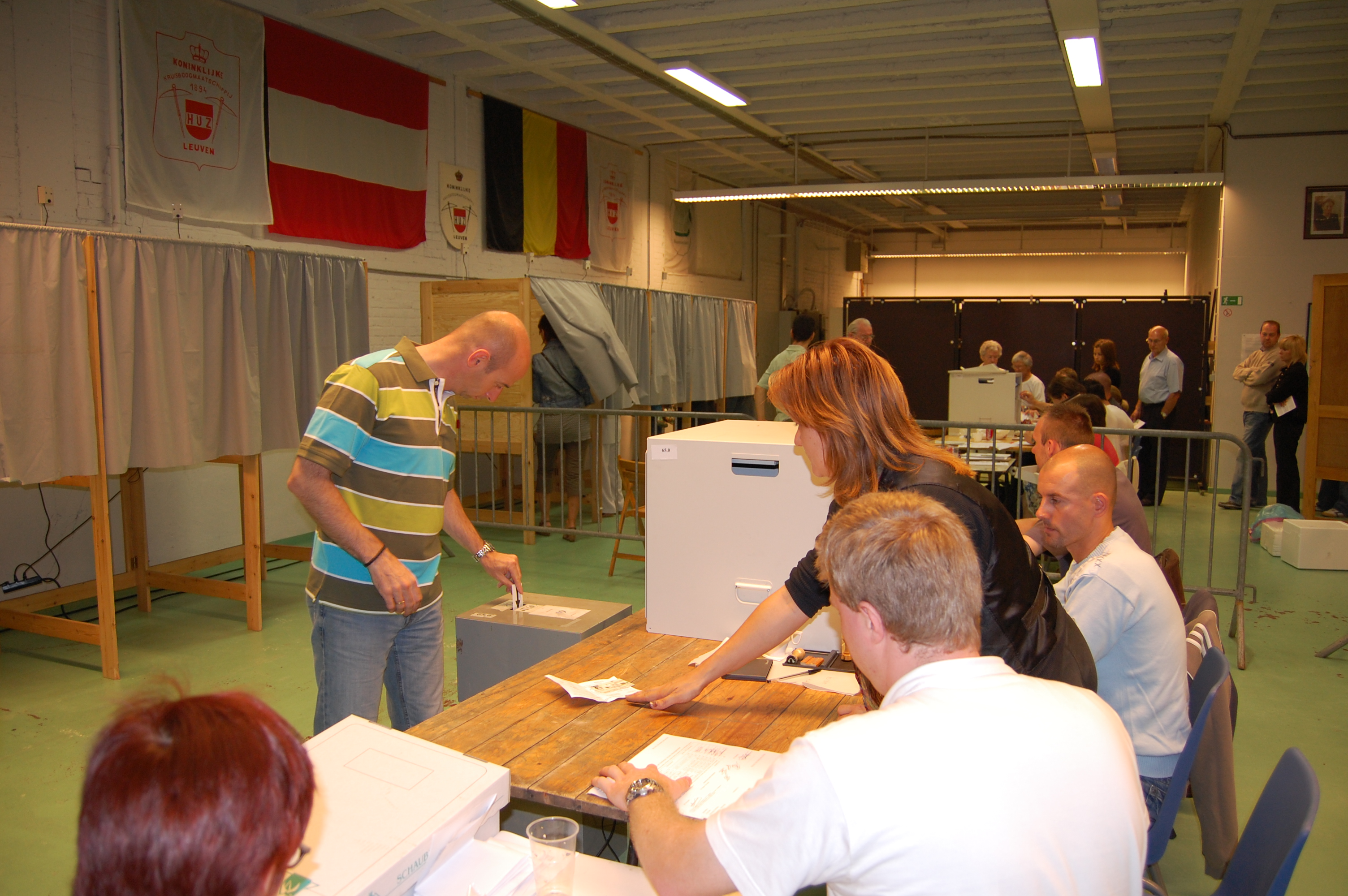
Voters in Leuven on 10 June 2007

Federal elections were held in Belgium on 10 June 2007. Voters went to the polls in order to elect new members for the Chamber of Representatives and Senate.

Eligible voters were Belgian citizens 18 years and older. There was a legal electoral threshold of 5% for political parties to meet to receive representation, but in several election districts the real electoral threshold is higher than the legal, due to the small number of seats to be elected in the particular district. The 150 members of the Chamber of Representatives were elected from 11 electoral districts. The 40 Senate members were elected from the Dutch (25) and Francophone (15) electoral colleges.

Of the Flemish parties, the alliance of Christian Democratic and Flemish party (CD&V) and the New-Flemish Alliance (N-VA) received an increased share of the vote from the previous election, held in 2003. The CD&V/N-VA list was headed by Yves Leterme, and became the largest political formation in Belgium, thus leading the coalition talks for a new government. Vlaams Belang received more votes than in the previous election, but lost one seat. Groen! was able to return to parliament and newcomers Lijst Dedecker surprised most by immediately grabbing six seats, including one in the Senate. Prime minister Guy Verhofstadt's "purple coalition," consisting of his Open Flemish Liberals and Democrats (Open Vld) alliance list and Socialist Party – Different (sp.a/spirit), was punished in the election, with the sp.a/spirit alliance losing somewhat more than Verhofstadt's Open Vld alliance. The day after the election, Verhofstadt handed in the resignation of his government to King Albert II. SP.A leader Johan Vande Lanotte resigned from his leadership position as well that day.

The Francophone situation did not mirror its Flemish counterpart. While Verhofstadt's Open Vld struggled, its Francophone sister party Mouvement Réformateur managed to defeat the long-dominant Parti Socialiste (PS), although the PS remained strong in Hainaut and Liège. The Humanist Democratic Centre brought in a positive result as well, but the biggest gains were for the environmentalist party Ecolo.

The overall outcome of the elections was that the liberal fraction (MR, Open Vld) became the largest group in parliament with, followed by the Christian Democrats (CD&V, cdH) and N-VA with 40 seats. The electoral alliance between the Flemish CD&V and N-VA parties became the biggest single parliamentary grouping (25 seats for CD&V and 5 for N-VA).

== Background ==
The previous general election in 2003 had resulted in a coalition between the socialist parties sp.a/spirit (Flemish) and the Parti Socialiste (Francophone), and the centrist liberal-democratic parties VLD/Vivant (Flemish) and MR (Francophone), with Guy Verhofstadt of the VLD to retaining his position of Prime Minister of Belgium until 2007.

== Parties ==
Only parties who fielded candidates for the Belgian Senate are listed.

=== Flemish parties (Dutch speaking) ===
These Flemish parties field candidates in the regions of Flanders and the partially bilingual electoral district Brussels-Halle-Vilvoorde.

==== CD&V/N-VA ====
The Christian Democratic and Flemish party (CD&V) is a Christian Democratic party that has formed an alliance with the Flemish nationalist party New-Flemish Alliance (N-VA). Most polls in the run-up to the election suggested that the alliance would win the election and become the largest political force in Flanders. It is led by Yves Leterme, current prime minister of the Flemish Region and Community.

Having become the largest political party in the Belgian Chamber after the 2007 election, the alliance will become the fulcrum of the coalition talks for a new government. Commentators suggest that coalition talks will be difficult, as most Francophone parties see the alliance as being overly Flemish-dominated.

==== VB ====
It was the first time that the Flemish Interest (Vlaams Belang, VB) had taken part in federal elections under its new name. Ostracized by all other political parties because of its views on foreigners and immigration, the VB is unlikely to take part in a new government. The VB's lists also included members of the right-liberal Flemish Liberal Independent Tolerant and Transparent party (VLOTT) of Hugo Coveliers.

==== sp.a–Spirit ====
The Socialistische Partij Anders is a social-democratic party and has formed a cartel list with the Flemish regionalist and left liberal party Spirit. Like their coalition partner VLD, they lost heavily in the election, which prompted sp.a party leader Johan Vande Lanotte to step down. Vande Lanotte made it also clear that the alliance will not take part in a federal government whose sole concern is state reform.

==== Open VLD ====
Open Flemish Liberals and Democrats (Open Vld) is the alliance list of the Flemish Liberals and Democrats (VLD) of prime minister Guy Verhofstadt, and the small liberal political parties Vivant (left-liberal) and Liberal Appeal (Liberaal Appèl) (right-liberal).

The VLD has seen some infighting in the last years, resulting in two prominent members leaving the party, Hugo Coveliers (VLOTT) and Jean-Marie Dedecker (Lijst Dedecker). After the 2006 municipal elections, the party had tried to revamp itself with the newly named Open Vld cartel, under direction of noted political strategist Noël Slangen.

==== Groen! ====
Groen! is an ecological party, and the successor of Agalev. It hoped to make a return to the federal legislature after being wiped out in the 2003 general election. They managed to return to the Belgian parliament with four House seats and one senate seat, but their result of 6.3% was below expectations.

==== LDD ====
List Dedecker (Lijst Dedecker) is a liberal offshoot of the Flemish Liberals and Democrats, founded by Belgian Senator Jean-Marie Dedecker and Boudewijn Bouckaert, chairman of the Nova Civitas think tank. The party surprised some who doubted it would clear the 5% electoral threshold by receiving 6.3% of the Flemish vote.

==== PVDA+ ====
The Workers' Party of Belgium (Partij van de Arbeid van België) is a radical left wing party, of Maoist origin. Its lists also contain independent candidates. The PVDA almost doubled their votes, from 0.5% to 0.9%.

==== CAP ====
The Committee for Another Policy (Comité voor een Andere Politiek) is a bilingual left wing political movement, consisting of trade union militants, and political militants of communist, Trotskyist and socialist origin. It was formed in 2006 as a reaction to the more centrist course of the SP.a. Former SP.a-representative Jef Sleeckx is one of the co-founders. These elections were the first the movement participated in. They got 0.4% of the votes in Flanders.

=== Francophone parties (French speaking) ===
These Francophone parties fielded candidates in the Walloon Region and in the electoral district Brussels-Halle-Vilvoorde.

==== PS ====
The Parti Socialiste (PS) is a social-democratic party that took part in the Verhofstadt I Government and the Verhofstadt II Government. It is unlikely that the PS will deliver Belgium's next prime minister, the last Francophone prime minister was Paul Vanden Boeynants in 1978–79. Largest competitor of the PS is the Mouvement Réformateur (MR), which just recently broke with the PS in Charleroi, after PS aldermen were charged with corruption.

==== MR ====
The Mouvement Réformateur is a liberal party. It is a fusion of the Liberal Reformist Party (PRL), the French-linguistic party Democratic Front of Francophones (FDF) and a breakaway fraction of the Christian democratic Citizens' Movement for Change (MCC). It had taken part in the federal government of Guy Verhofstadt, which included MR leader Didier Reynders as finance minister.

The MR clearly won the elections in the French-speaking Walloon region, and the bilingual Brussels-Capital Region, ousting the previously dominant Parti Socialiste. The MR campaigned on three major fronts: the need for an alternative to the PS, entangled in various scandals of corruption and accused of poor governance leading to unemployment and anachronistic political systems; the need for a new fiscal reform; lowering taxes and government grip on the economy; and finally friendliness and cooperation with its Flemish counterpart, Open VLD.

==== cdH ====
The Centre Démocrate Humaniste is a Christian democratic party. They made a small advance (0.4%) in these elections and finished with 15.8% of the votes.

==== Ecolo ====
Ecolo is a Green party. It made the largest gains of the 2007 election among Francophone parties and went from 7.5% to 12.8%.

==== FN ====
The Front National is a Franco-nationalist political movement known for its tough stances on immigration. They gained 5.6% of the vote, the same as in 2003.

==== CAP ====
The Committee for Another Policy (Comité pour une Autre Politique) was a bilingual left wing political movement, consisting of trade union militants, and political militants of communist, Trotskyist and socialist origin. It was formed in 2006 as a reaction to the more centrist course of the PS and the SP.a. Former FGTB-chairman Georges Debunne was one of the co-founders. These elections were the first the movement participated in. The party got 0.2% of the votes in Hainaut and Liège, the two provinces where its candidates stood.

== Issues ==
=== Good governance ===
CD&V used the theme of good governance as a breaking point against sp.a and VLD. The party claimed that unlike in the Flemish Government, where CD&V leader Leterme heads a tripartite government, with CD&V, VLD and sp.a, the federal government lacked good governance. sp.a and VLD tried to counter this charge with similar examples in the Flemish Government of practices which CD&V accused them of.

=== Brussels-Halle-Vilvoorde and constitutionality ===
With the federal elections looming, the problem of the electoral district of Brussels-Halle-Vilvoorde (B-H-V) re-emerged. Because the federal government failed to comply with a ruling of the Court of Arbitration which declared the provincial electoral districts compared to the two remaining arrondisemental ones in the former province of Brabant unconstitutional. According to the ruling of the Court of Arbitration the current situation would make federal elections impossible after 24 June 2007, so the new government will have to solve the situation. Several mayors in the Brussels-Halle-Vilvoorde area have threatened and actually have refused to compile the lists of electors. The governor took over their task.

Professor and constitutional expert Paul Van Orshoven from the Katholieke Universiteit Leuven declared that the elections would be unconstitutional. According to Van Orshoven there were two problems:

- As the previous election was held on Sunday 18 May 2003, the final date to hold elections (four years from the previous) would be Sunday, 13 May 2007.
- The Court of Arbitration gave the government the time to fix the B-H-V problem until the next elections. That hasn't happened, which means that the election results could be declared void.

=== Corruption in the Walloon Region ===
During the campaign new irregularities and corruption in PS-lead Charleroi emerged. The MR started using this as an example of why things in Wallonia under PS management were bad. The campaign became hostile and personal attacks between various MR, cdH and PS leaders dominated the campaign.

=== Armenian genocide ===
In the run-up to the election, Johan Vande Lanotte, leader of the Socialist Party – Different, refused to acknowledge the Turkish genocide on its Armenian minority in the midst of a controversy about the strong allegiance to Turkey expressed in Turkish at a meeting by a Turkish-Belgian CD&V Senate candidate, Ergün Top, but also in the aftermath of a similar problem aroused during the campaign for the Dutch general election a few months earlier. The position of Yves Leterme (CD&V) on this issue was unclear at first, but he later confided to the Flemish parliament that he does acknowledge the Armenian genocide.

In 1998, the Belgian Senate had already passed a resolution acknowledging the Armenian genocide, including the support of SP (later sp.a) and CVP (later CD&V) senators.

== Opinion polls ==
The polls conducted by the Stemmenkampioen site of Het Laatste Nieuws and the Vrije Universiteit Brussel , yield the following overall result for Flanders, compared to the 2003 Senate elections. De Standaard and the VRT conducted a similar poll in November 2006, in March 2007 (the first poll in which Lijst Dedecker, a Flemish party founded in January 2007, was measured) and in May 2007.

=== Flanders ===
Polling firm	Fieldwork date	Sample size	Margin of error	CD&V–N-VA	VB	sp.a–spirit	Open Vld	Groen!	LDD	Others / None	Lead
De Standaard/VRT	8 Jun 2007	–	–	29.9%	21.4%	19.4%	17.7%	7.7%	3.8%	0.3%	8.5%
ULB/Le Soir/RTBf	17–30 May 2007	3,070	± 2.2%	29.7%	21.6%	19.7%	17.3%	7.4%	–	–	8.1%
De Standaard/VRT	17 Apr–11 May 2007	4,206	–	29.9%	20.7%	20.4%	17.3%	8.4%	2.1%	1.1%	9.2%
ULB/Le Soir/RTBf	29 Apr 2007	870	± 2.2%	29.6%	21.9%	20.3%	16.6%	6.7%	2.8%	–	7.7%
De Standaard/VRT	16 Mar 2007	–	–	30.4%	20.8%	20.7%	16.9%	7.6%	3.2%	–	9.6%
Het Laatste Nieuws	Jan 2007	812		30%	20%	17%	15%	5%	–	–	10%
De Standaard/VRT	31 Oct–16 Nov 2006	1,076	–	32.7%	21.9%	19.7%	17.3%	7.6%	–	–	10.8%

=== Wallonia ===
Polling firm	Fieldwork date	Sample size	Margin of error	PS	MR	cdH	Ecolo	FN	Others / None	Lead
ULB/Le Soir/RTBf	17–30 May 2007	3,070	± 2.2%	31.4%	26.5%	19.2%	9.7%	8.1%	–	4.9%
ULB/Le Soir/RTBf	29 Apr 2007	3,390	± 2.2%	33.4%	24.5%	19.0%	9.6%	8.2%	–	8.9%

=== Brussels ===
Polling firm	Fieldwork date	Sample size	Margin of error	MR	PS	cdH	Ecolo	Others / None	Lead
ULB/Le Soir/RTBf	17–30 May 2007	3,070	± 2.2%	27.4%	25.0%	15.3%	10.5%	–	2.4%
ULB/Le Soir/RTBf	29 Apr 2007	880	± 2.2%	27.9%	25.9%	–	–	–	2.0%

== Results ==
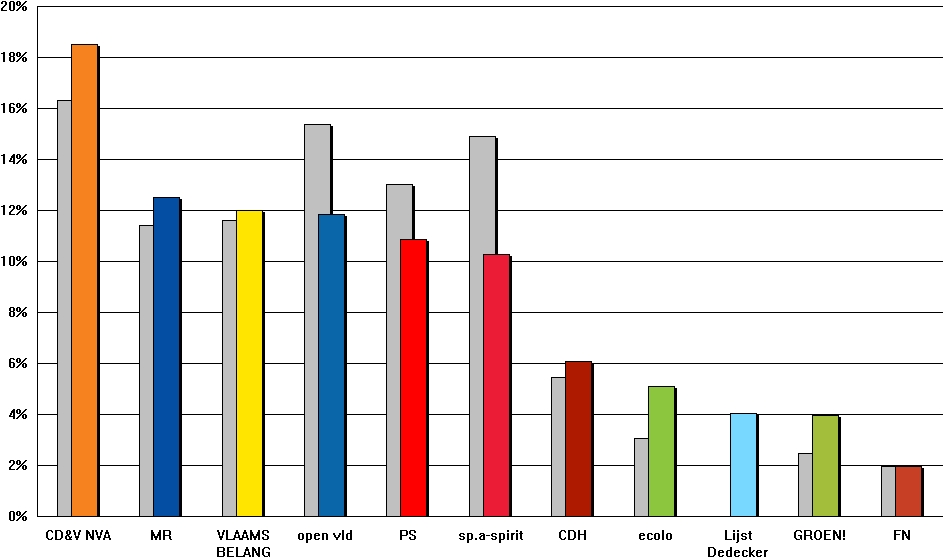
This graph shows the Belgian Chamber of Representatives 2007 election results (colour) compared to those of 2003 (grey).

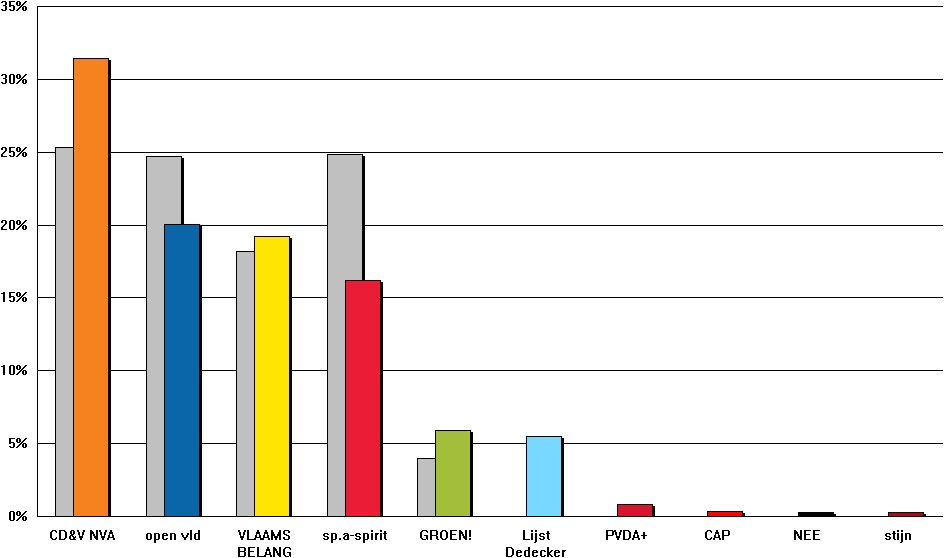
This graph shows the Dutch-speaking Belgian Senate 2007 election results (colour) compared to those of 2003 (grey).

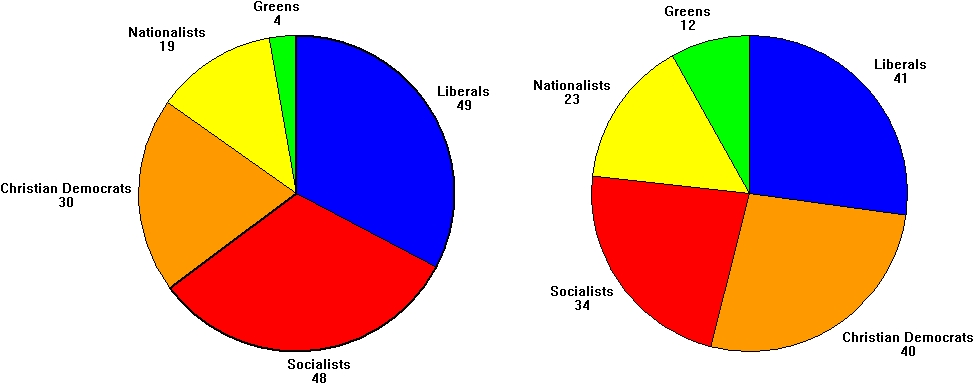
This chart shows the Belgian Chamber of Representatives 2007 election results (right) compared to those of 2003 (left). The bold line shows the majority coalition.

=== Chamber of Representatives ===
Party	Votes	%	+/–	Seats	+/–
CD&V–New Flemish Alliance	1,234,950	18.51	+2.20	30	+8
Mouvement Réformateur	835,073	12.52	+1.12	23	–1
Vlaams Belang	799,844	11.99	+0.40	17	–1
Open Vlaamse Liberalen en Democraten	789,445	11.83	–3.53	18	–7
Parti Socialiste	724,787	10.86	–2.16	20	–5
Socialistische Partij Anders–Spirit	684,390	10.26	–4.65	14	–9
Centre démocrate humaniste	404,077	6.06	+0.59	10	+2
Ecolo	340,378	5.10	+2.04	8	+4
Lijst Dedecker	268,648	4.03	New	5	New
Groen!	265,828	3.98	+1.51	4	+4
National Front	131,385	1.97	–0.01	1	0
Workers' Party of Belgium	56,167	0.84	+0.53	0	0
Rassemblement Wallonie France	26,240	0.39	+0.00	0	0
Committee for Another Policy	20,083	0.30	New	0	New
Communist Party of Belgium	19,329	0.29	+0.19	0	0
Chrétiens démocrates fédéraux	11,961	0.18	–0.40	0	0
Front Nouveau de Belgique	9,010	0.14	+0.04	0	0
Wallon	8,688	0.13	New	0	New
Belgian Union	8,607	0.13	+0.09	0	0
National Force	6,660	0.10	New	0	New
Vivant	5,742	0.09	–0.35	0	0
Parti jeunes musulmans	4,373	0.07	New	0	New
Parti Wallon	3,139	0.05	New	0	New
Vrijheid, Intimiteit, Thuis, Arbeid en Liefde	1,780	0.03	+0.01	0	0
Nieuwe Partij – Fervent Nationaal	1,605	0.02	New	0	New
Vélorution	1,453	0.02	New	0	New
Union pour un mouvement populaire – Belgique	1,408	0.02	New	0	New
MP Éducation	1,362	0.02	New	0	New
Trefle	920	0.01	New	0	New
Front des Bruxellois	901	0.01	New	0	New
Belgique Positif	880	0.01	New	0	New
Unie	856	0.01	New	0	New
Pluralis	757	0.01	New	0	New
Droit et libertés des citoyens	464	0.01	New	0	New
Groupe social des citoyens démocrates	170	0.00	New	0	New
Total	6,671,360	100.00	–	150	0
Valid votes	6,671,360	94.87			
Invalid/blank votes	360,717	5.13			
Total votes	7,032,077	100.00			
Registered voters/turnout	7,720,796	91.08			
Source: IBZ

The newly constituted Chamber met for the first time on Thursday 28 June 2007, when the Representatives took the oath of office.

=== Senate ===
Party	Votes	%	+/–	Seats	+/–
CD&V–New Flemish Alliance	1,287,389	19.42	+3.65	9	+3
Open Vlaamse Liberalen en Democraten	821,980	12.40	–2.98	5	–2
Mouvement Réformateur	815,755	12.31	+0.16	6	+1
Vlaams Belang	787,782	11.89	+0.57	5	0
Parti Socialiste	678,812	10.24	–2.60	4	–2
Socialistische Partij Anders–Spirit	665,342	10.04	–5.43	4	–3
Centre démocrate humaniste	390,852	5.90	+0.36	2	0
Ecolo	385,466	5.82	+2.63	2	+1
Groen!	241,151	3.64	+1.18	1	+1
Lijst Dedecker	223,992	3.38	New	1	New
National Front	150,461	2.27	+0.02	1	0
Workers' Party of Belgium	54,807	0.83	+0.01	0	0
Rassemblement Wallonie France	32,094	0.48	+0.06	0	0
Committee for Another Policy	21,215	0.32	New	0	New
Communist Party of Belgium	19,632	0.30	New	0	New
National Force	14,866	0.22	New	0	New
Chrétiens démocrates fédéraux	13,319	0.20	–0.39	0	0
NEE	12,115	0.18	New	0	New
Stijn	11,097	0.17	New	0	New
Total	6,628,127	100.00	–	40	0
Valid votes	6,628,127	94.25			
Invalid/blank votes	404,257	5.75			
Total votes	7,032,384	100.00			
Registered voters/turnout	7,720,796	91.08			
Source: IBZ

21 Community Senators and 10 Coopted Senators were also appointed. The definite distribution is not known. On Thursday 28 June 2007, the directly elected Senators took the oath of office. One week later, on 5 July 2007, the Community Senators took the oath, and two weeks later, on 12 July 2007, the Coopted Senators took the oath. On that day, the Senate was fully constituted.

== Government formation ==
Due to differences in view with regards to constitutional reform between the Flemish and Francophone parties, the negotiations to form a new government proceeded with much difficulty.

On 13 June 2007, King Albert II appointed MR leader Didier Reynders informateur, (someone who assesses the possibilities for government coalitions). Prior to his appointment, in his position as party leader, Reynders had indicated his preference for a coalition of Christian Democratic parties CD&V (Flanders) and cdH (Wallonia) and liberal parties MR (Wallonia) and Open VLD (Flanders). Reynders presented his final report to the King on 4 July 2007. Following the report, King Albert II appointed former Prime Minister Jean-Luc Dehaene as mediator to prepare the ground for the formateur and to look into the possibility of a state reform.

The King then appointed Yves Leterme of the CD&V as formateur (giving him the task of forming a coalition). Negotiations were temporarily halted on 17 August to give the King the possibility to mediate. Upon the further failure of the negotiations, on 23 August Leterme resigned as formateur. As no acceptable mediator could be found, on 27 August, the King took the unusual step to consult 13 Ministers of State to find way out of the political crisis. At the end of August, the King appointed Herman Van Rompuy (also CD&V and President of the Belgian Chamber of Representatives since July) as explorateur (scout). Following Rompuy's report, Leterme was again appointed formateur on 15 September. After two months of further negotiations, Leterme was still unable to form a coalition and resigned as formateur for a second time on 1 December.

== See also ==
- 2007–2011 Belgian political crisis
