= Leterme I Government =

Federal government of Belgium (2008-2008)

(Belgium) 2007–2011 Belgian political crisis

Timeline
- 2007 elections
  - 2007–2008 government formation
  - Verhofstadt III (interim)
  - Leterme I
  - Van Rompuy I
  - Leterme II
- 2010 elections
  - 2010–2011 government formation
  - Di Rupo I
  - Sixth state reform
See also
- Brussels-Halle-Vilvoorde
- Partition of Belgium
- State reform in Belgium
- Politics of Belgium
- Cabinet of Belgium

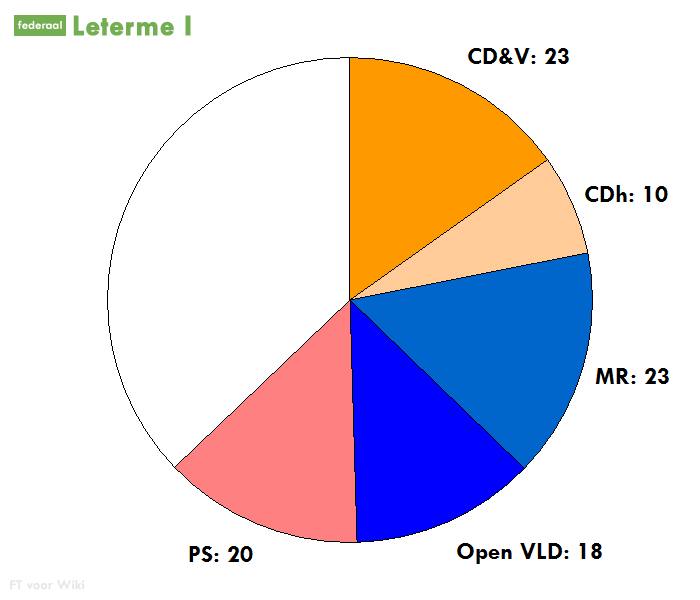

The Leterme I Government was the federal government of Belgium from 20 March 2008 to 22 December 2008. It took office when the Flemish Christian democrat Yves Leterme (CD&V) was sworn in as Prime Minister. It followed the Belgian general election of 2007 and comprised five parties: the Dutch-speaking Christian Democratic and Flemish (CD&V), the Dutch-speaking Open Flemish Liberals and Democrats (Open VLD), the French-speaking liberal Reformist Movement (MR), the French-speaking Socialist Party (PS) and the French-speaking Humanist Democratic Centre (CDH).

The government received the confidence of the Chamber of Representatives on 22 March 2008, with 97 votes in favour, 48 against, and one abstaining.

It was succeeded by a government led by CD&V member Herman Van Rompuy on 30 December 2008.

== Composition ==
The Leterme I Government comprised 15 ministers and seven secretaries of state. Its final composition was as follows:

Minister	Name	Party
Prime Minister	Yves Leterme	CD&V
Deputy Prime Minister - Finance and Institutional Reforms	Didier Reynders	MR
Deputy Prime Minister - Social Affairs and Public Health	Laurette Onkelinx	PS
Deputy Prime Minister - Interior	Patrick Dewael	Open VLD
Deputy Prime Minister - Justice and Institutional Reforms	Jo Vandeurzen	CD&V
Deputy Prime Minister - Employment and Equal Opportunities	Joëlle Milquet	CDH
Foreign Affairs	Karel De Gucht	Open VLD
SMEs, the Self-employed, Agriculture and Science Policy	Sabine Laruelle	MR
Social Integration, Pensions and Large Cities	Marie Arena	PS
Defence	Pieter De Crem	CD&V
Climate and Energy	Paul Magnette	PS
Development Cooperation	Charles Michel	MR
Civil Service and Public Enterprises	Inge Vervotte	CD&V
Enterprise and Simplification	Vincent Van Quickenborne	Open VLD
Migration and Asylum Policy	Annemie Turtelboom	Open VLD
Secretary of State	Name	Party
Mobility (Prime Minister)	Etienne Schouppe	CD&V
Coordination of the Fight against Fraud (Prime Minister)	Carl Devlies	CD&V
Finance (Finance)	Bernard Clerfayt	FDF
Preparation of the European Presidency (Foreign Affairs)	Olivier Chastel	MR
Fight against Poverty (Social Integration, Pensions and Large Cities)	Jean-Marc Delizée	PS
Disabled Persons (Social Affairs and Public Health)	Julie Fernandez-Fernandez	PS
Budget (Prime Minister) and Family Policy (Employment)	Melchior Wathelet Jr.	CDH

=== Changes ===
- On 19 April 2008, Frédéric Laloux (PS) resigned as Secretary of State for the Fight against Poverty after a scandal when it became clear a judicial investigation related to his time as an alderman in Namur was being conducted. He was succeeded on 20 April by Jean-Marc Délizée.
- On 19 December 2008, Jo Vandeurzen resigned as Deputy Prime Minister and Minister of Justice and Institutional Reforms in the wake of accusations that he and Leterme improperly tried to influence the judgement of the court of appeal regarding the sale of Fortis. Later that day Leterme offered the resignation of his entire government.

== Government crises ==
In the late hours of 14 July 2008, after months of negotiations regarding constitutional reform and the status of the Brussels-Halle-Vilvoorde electoral district failed, and the deadline of 15 July 2008 neared without the hope of a result, Leterme offered the resignation of his cabinet to the king. After a series of consultations, King Albert II decided to reject Prime Minister Leterme's resignation on 17 July. The royal palace said that the King had asked two senior French-speaking politicians, François-Xavier de Donnéa (MR) and Raymond Langendries (CDH), and the Minister-President of the German-speaking Community, Karl-Heinz Lambertz (SP), to establish how to start talks about institutional reform. They were expected to report back to the king by the end of the month. However, on 31 July 2008, they reported that they needed more time for the negotiations.

On 19 December 2008, Yves Leterme offered the resignation of his government to King Albert after a crisis surrounding the sale of Fortis to BNP Paribas erupted. Leterme, Jo Vandeurzen, and Didier Reynders were accused of violating the separation of powers by trying to influence the court of appeal and of exerting improper influence by the First Chairman of the Court of Cassation. Three days later the resignation was accepted by the king.

== See also ==
- 2007–2011 Belgian political crisis
