= Van Rompuy Government =

(Belgium) 2007–2011 Belgian political crisis

Timeline
- 2007 elections
  - 2007–2008 government formation
  - Verhofstadt III (interim)
  - Leterme I
  - Van Rompuy I
  - Leterme II
- 2010 elections
  - 2010–2011 government formation
  - Di Rupo I
  - Sixth state reform
See also
- Brussels-Halle-Vilvoorde
- Partition of Belgium
- State reform in Belgium
- Politics of Belgium
- Cabinet of Belgium

The Van Rompuy Government was the federal government of Belgium from 30 December 2008 until 15 November 2009. Herman Van Rompuy was nominated as the first President of the European Council and resigned shortly after as Premier. It took office when the Flemish Christian Democrat Herman Van Rompuy (Christian Democratic and Flemish, CD&V) was sworn in as Prime Minister after the Leterme I Government fell on 22 December 2008.

On 18 December 2008, Yves Leterme offered his government's resignation to King Albert after a scandal erupted surrounding the investigation of the sale of the failing Fortis bank to BNP Paribas. Leterme, Jo Vandeurzen, and Didier Reynders were accused of violating the separation of powers by trying to influence the Court of Appeals and of exerting improper influence by the First Chairman of the Court of Cassation. Three days later the resignation was accepted by the king.

To be official, the Van Rompuy I government needed a vote of confidence from the Chamber of Representatives. It received the vote of confidence on 2 January 2009.

The government was succeeded on 24 November 2009 by the Leterme II Government.

== Composition ==
The Van Rompuy I Government comprises 15 ministers and seven secretaries of state. Its initial composition is as follows:

Minister	Name	Party
Prime Minister	Herman Van Rompuy	CD&V
Deputy Prime Minister - Finance and Institutional Reforms	Didier Reynders	MR
Deputy Prime Minister - Social Affairs and Public Health	Laurette Onkelinx	PS
Deputy Prime Minister - Budget	Guy Vanhengel	Open VLD
Deputy Prime Minister - Civil Service and Public Enterprise	Steven Vanackere	CD&V
Deputy Prime Minister - Employment and Equal Opportunities	Joëlle Milquet	CDH
Justice	Stefaan De Clerck	CD&V
Defence	Pieter De Crem	CD&V
Pensions and Large Cities	Michel Daerden	PS
Climate and Energy	Paul Magnette	PS
Development Cooperation	Charles Michel	MR
SMEs, the Self-employed, Agriculture and Science Policy	Sabine Laruelle	MR
Interior	Annemie Turtelboom	Open VLD
Enterprise and Simplification	Vincent Van Quickenborne	Open VLD
Foreign Affairs	Yves Leterme	CD&V
Secretary of State	Name	Party
Mobility (Prime Minister)	Etienne Schouppe	CD&V
Coordination of the Fight against Fraud (Prime Minister)	Carl Devlies	CD&V
Finance (Finance)	Bernard Clerfayt	MR
Preparation of the European Presidency (Foreign Affairs)	Olivier Chastel	MR
Social Integration and the Fight against Poverty (Social Affairs and Public Health)	Philippe Courard	PS
Disabled Persons (Social Affairs and Public Health)	Jean-Marc Delizée	PS
Budget (Budget), Family Policy (Justice/Employment) and Asylum and Immigration (Prime Minister)	Melchior Wathelet Jr.	CDH

=== Government reshuffle ===
On 17 July 2009, as a consequence of the regional elections, the government was reshuffled:

- Karel De Gucht (VLD), who was appointed European Commissioner was succeeded by Yves Leterme (CD&V) as minister of Foreign Affairs
- Guido De Padt (VLD) was replaced as minister of the interior by Annemie Turtelboom (VLD); De Padt was appointed government commissioner for the internal audit of the federal government.
- Guy Vanhengel (VLD) entered the government as Deputy Prime Minister and Minister of the Budget
- Melchior Wathelet jr. stayed on as state secretary for the budget but received the competences Asylum and immigration which were previously held by Minister Turtelboom.
- Marie Arena (PS) was replaced as minister of Pensions and Large Cities by Michel Daerden
- Julie Fernandez-Fernandez (PS) was replaced as state secretary for Disabled Persons by Jean-Marc Delizée (PS). Delizée in turn was replaced as state secretary for the Fight against Poverty by Philippe Courard (PS). Courard also received the competences of social integration from Arena.

== See also ==
- 2007–2011 Belgian political crisis
