= 2010–2011 Belgian government formation =

(Belgium) 2007–2011 Belgian political crisis

Timeline
- 2007 elections
  - 2007–2008 government formation
  - Verhofstadt III (interim)
  - Leterme I
  - Van Rompuy I
  - Leterme II
- 2010 elections
  - 2010–2011 government formation
  - Di Rupo I
  - Sixth state reform
See also
- Brussels-Halle-Vilvoorde
- Partition of Belgium
- State reform in Belgium
- Politics of Belgium
- Cabinet of Belgium

Following the Belgian general election held on 13 June 2010, a process of cabinet formation started in Belgium. The election produced a very fragmented political landscape, with 11 parties elected to the Chamber of Representatives, none of which won more than 20% of the seats. The Flemish-Nationalist New Flemish Alliance (N-VA), the largest party in Flanders and the country as a whole, controlled 27 of 150 seats in the lower chamber. The Francophone Socialist Party (PS), the largest in Wallonia, controlled 26 seats. Cabinet negotiations continued for a long time. On 1 June 2011, Belgium matched the record for time taken to form a new democratic government after an election, at 353 days, held until then by Cambodia in 2003–2004. On 11 October 2011, the final agreement for institutional reform was presented to the media. A government coalition was named on 5 December 2011 and sworn in after a total of 541 days of negotiations and formation on 6 December 2011, and 589 days without an elected government with Elio Di Rupo named Prime Minister of the Di Rupo I Government.

== Background ==
Tensions had risen between the Flemings and the Walloons: Flanders accused the Walloon region of being dependent on economic subsidies from the Flemish region. The Walloon population accused the Flemish of being segregationist with the language policy in the Flemish region.

The most recent election had been fought mainly on the failure to resolve the conflict over the electoral arrondissement of Brussels-Halle-Vilvoorde. The conflict centred on political and linguistic differences in the arrondissement, with the Flemish desiring to split the arrondissement into two separate areas, while the Walloons wished to keep it together.

== Informateur De Wever ==
Bart De Wever (N-VA) announced he would seek negotiations with the PS. PS leader Elio Di Rupo was tipped to become the next Prime Minister, because the "Socialist" parties emerged as the largest "party family" in the elections (39 seats in total), and because the N-VA lacks a Francophone counterpart.

The King of the Belgians, Albert II, gave Bart De Wever the task of informateur (someone who prepares for a formateur, the person who leads the formation of a coalition government) to smooth the path for the future government. One of the tipped "optimal" coalitions is what is called the "mirror government," a government using the same coalitions that exist in the Flemish (CD&V, N-VA and SP.A) and Walloon (PS, CDH and Ecolo) regions respectively, though in the federal government.

== Pre-formateur Di Rupo ==
De Wever reported back to the king on 8 July 2010, suggesting that there was "not enough agreement on key issues" for a coalition to work and was therefore relieved of his duty as informateur. The king was expected to appoint PS leader Elio Di Rupo as formateur. However, on 9 July the king appointed Di Rupo "pre-formateur" instead, a new position stopping short of the traditional prime-minister-in-waiting role of formateur; it was likely intentionally established as a new position as appointing Di Rupo as "explorer" or "deminer" would have reminded voters of the government formation crisis of 2007–2008.

Originally, Di Rupo seemed to be, according to analysts, looking at the possibility of a coalition between the N-VA, CD&V and the SP.a on the Flemish side. However, Di Rupo eventually expanded his consultations to include the heads of the major democratic political parties in order to forge a so-called "dual approach", attempting to create the two-thirds majority needed to enact institutional reforms, especially in the case of Brussels-Halle-Vilvoorde.

Unfortunately, Di Rupo was unable to reach a consensus between the parties. The N-VA and the CD&V accused the Walloon parties of moving too slowly in negotiations, as well as being too vague and too reserved in the details on the concessions they were willing to make. On 29 July 2010, Di Rupo met with the King to give the sovereign a progress report on negotiations.

=== Attempted resignation ===
On 29 August 2010, Di Rupo met with King Albert and submitted his resignation as pre-formateur, releasing a statement to the press suggesting that the N-VA and the CD&V were unwilling to continue negotiations. This came on the heels of the N-VA and the CD&V's rejection of a potential compromise. The king, however, refused to accept the resignation, asking Di Rupo to continue as pre-formateur in an attempt to reach one final agreement.

In a press conference the next day, Di Rupo explained where the deadlock lay. The parties involved were able to reach an agreement on how much control each region would have on income and spending, but were stuck on the issues of Brussels-Halle-Vilvoorde and funding for Brussels.

An agreement was not reached, and Di Rupo again asked the King to relieve him of his duties as pre-formateur on 3 September.

== Mediators Flahaut and Pieters ==
Upon Di Rupo's resignation, King Albert entrusted Danny Pieters, N-VA Senator and President of the Belgian Senate and André Flahaut, PS Representative and President of the Belgian Chamber of Representatives to act as mediators in order to revive the negotiating process.

The two mediators met with members of the seven parties and attempted to make some headway in the stalled negotiations by creating a framework to address concerns brought up in the pre-forming negotiations, something that the PS and the N-VA agreed to work within.

Concurrently, however, tensions began to strain negotiations, with the PS displaying frustration at the state of negotiations and accusing the N-VA of trying to sabotage the process. The N-VA suggested that the PS and the other Walloon parties were merely unwilling to part with the "pocket money federalism", which refers to the distribution of financial means in Belgium where the regional governments are not accountable for their earnings or spendings.

=== The N-VA exit negotiations ===
On 4 October, Bart De Wever called a press conference at his party's headquarters, and announced in a bilingual statement, that the N-VA would be pulling out of the current negotiations, calling on all parties involved to start over. "For us, this story ends," he said in his statement, "I refuse to participate in this childish game". He placed blame for the failure of the talks on the Walloon parties, saying "We received no answers to the vital questions being asked by Flemings". The Walloon parties shot back, saying that they no longer trusted De Wever, and again accused him of trying to deliberately derail negotiations. "After long weeks of negotiations we almost had a deal", said Laurette Onkelinx from the Parti Socialiste (PS). "What is on the table is a fundamental reform of Belgium and at the last moment Bart De Wever, with tears in his eyes, says 'no, sorry, but this is not enough'”

The next day, the king dismissed Pieters and Flahaut as mediators.

== Clarificator De Wever ==
On 8 October, King Albert gave a "clarification task" to Bart De Wever. He had to try to converge the viewpoints of the negotiating parties in 10 days.

On 17 October, De Wever presented to the parties the first written proposal of the negotiations. Within 24 hours, it was rejected by the Francophone parties (PS, cdH & Ecolo).

== Mediator Vande Lanotte ==
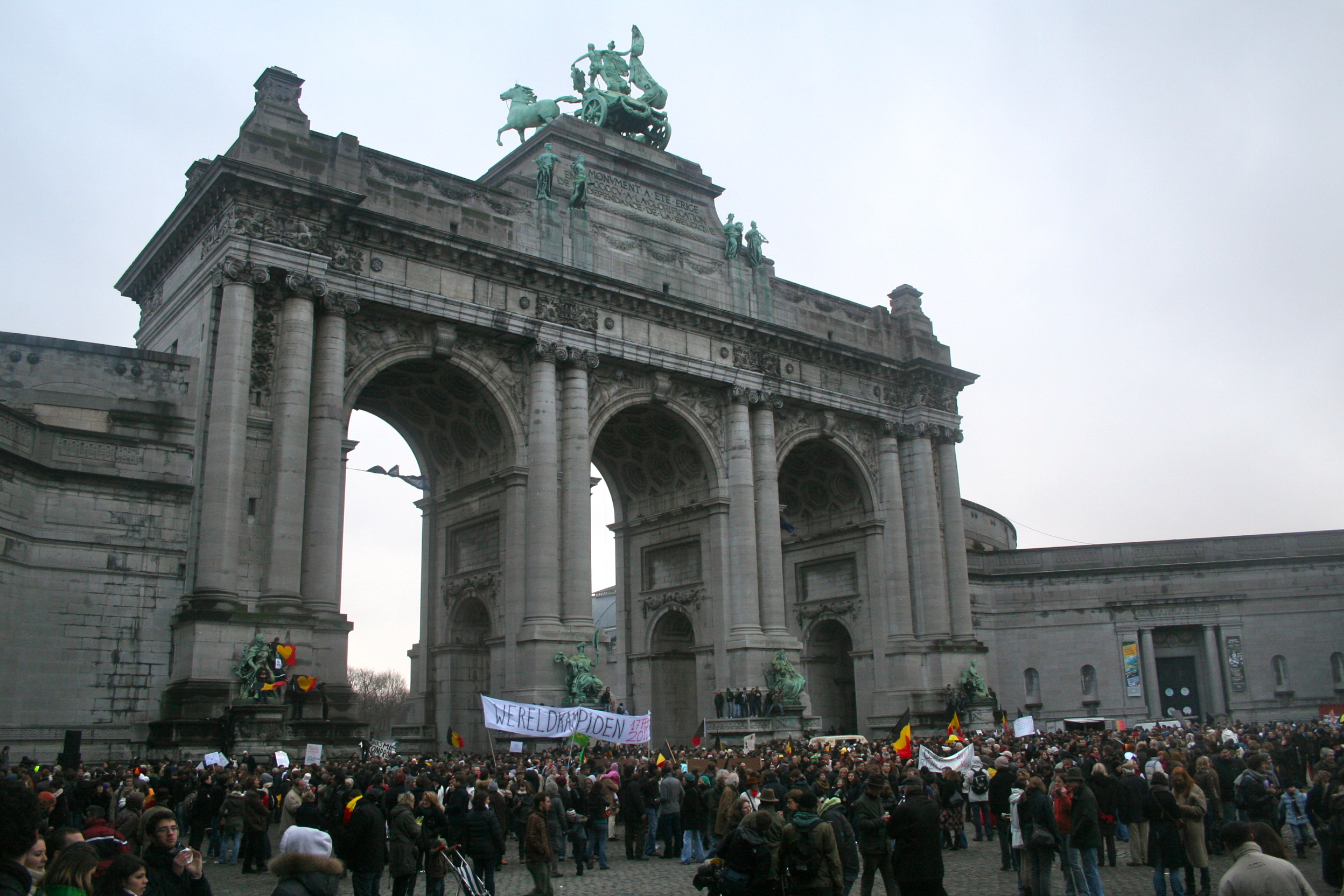
Citizens held a rally urging politicians to form a government in late January 2011.

On 21 October 2010, the King asked Johan Vande Lanotte, a former president of Flemish social-democratic party SP.a, to be a mediator to resume government formation talks soon. Meanwhile, Prime Minister Yves Leterme's outgoing government was asked by the King to stay on as a caretaker government with limited powers. As a result of this crisis, Belgium had no budget for 2011 and continued functioning with regular resolutions which prolonged the 2010 budget from month to month. Eventually on 10 January 2011, with no end to the political crisis in sight, and financial markets becoming alarmed about the lack of progress in addressing the budget deficit, Belgian King Albert II asked caretaker prime minister Leterme to craft a new budget for 2011.

While Vande Lanotte was preparing his proposal, the government formation broke the 2007 record of 194 days on 25 December.

On the evening of 3 January 2011, the presidents of each of the seven parties received a copy of the proposal by Vande Lanotte, which had been three months in the making. Each copy had ever so minimal differences as to recognize the source of any potentially leaked document. The 60-page-long document contains five chapters:

- Political renewal (Senate reform, concurrent elections each five years, ...)
- Transfer of several competences to regions
- Brussels (small internal reform, function of Governor abolished, ...)
- Brussels-Halle-Vilvoorde will be split (exceptions for municipalities with language facilities, ...)
- Finance law (transfer of taxes to the regions, ...)

The following day, all negotiating parties responded. The Flemish parties expressed strong reservations about Vande Lanotte's proposals, while the Francophone parties were lukewarm. Eventually five of the seven parties agreed to Vande Lanotte's proposal, but two Flemish parties rejected it outright.

On 6 January 2011, Vande Lanotte submitted his resignation to the king, requesting to be relieved of his position as mediator as he claimed there was a lack of political will to reach an agreement. However the resignation was rejected by King Albert. The King however assigned De Wever and Di Rupo to work in close cooperation with Vande Lanotte to reach an agreement that both the N-VA and the PS could support. This "triumvirate" did not work out, and on 26 January 2011 Vande Lanotte again requested the King to relieve him of his task, to which the King agreed.

== Informateur Didier Reynders ==
Finance minister Didier Reynders was appointed informateur by the king on 2 February 2011 and reported to the king on 16 February 2011, although the mission was extended to 1 March.

== Negotiator Wouter Beke ==
CD&V leader Wouter Beke was appointed negotiator (onderhandelaar) on 2 March 2011 by the king to try to find an agreement on state reform. He tendered his resignation on 12 May 2011.

== Formateur Elio Di Rupo ==
Elio Di Rupo was appointed formateur, someone to lead the formation of a coalition government, on 16 May 2011 by the king. Di Rupo presented his report and a negotiation proposal on 5 July 2011. However, De Wever rejected the proposal on 7 July 2011. There are now discussions whether an international mediator is a viable option, or whether elections will have to be held. Di Rupo tendered his resignation as formateur on 9 July 2011.

On 15 July 2011, he started a final attempt to form a government, with negotiations excluding N-VA, but including CD&V (who had previously stated they would not join a government without N-VA). On 20 July 2011, CD&V accepted certain conditions set by Di Rupo regarding the BHV issue, signaling a breakthrough in coalition negotiations.

On 6 September 2011, Di Rupo presented his updated reform plan. This was seen as the final push to finish coalition negotiations; should this attempt fail, early elections were expected to take place.

Amid news that caretaker PM Leterme would become deputy secretary-general of the OECD in 2012, coalition talks failed yet again on 14 September 2011, with an emergency meeting set for the same day. In the night from 14 to 15 September 2011, a compromise deal was finally reached on BHV. Late on 7 October 2011, the final details of the state reform were finally agreed upon.

== Agreement ==
On 11 October 2011, the agreement between the Flemish parties CD&V, Open VLD, sp.a, Groen! and the Francophone parties PS, MR, CDH and Ecolo for a sixth institutional reform was presented to the media.

- The electoral and judicial arrondissement of Brussels-Halle-Vilvoorde will be split.
- Competences worth €17 billion will be transferred from the federal level to the communities and regions. Regions will receive economy and employment matters, communities will be responsible for family policy.
- The Belgian Senate will no longer be directly elected, but will instead become an assembly of regional parliaments, with fewer members.

However, a government coalition still had to be formed. The green parties Groen! and Ecolo will not be in the coalition, because only a normal majority is needed to form a government. However, there will not be a majority on the Flemish side. A nuclear power phaseout was also agreed.

== Further talks ==
On 21 November 2011, Di Rupo presented a final proposal for the 2012 budget to the negotiation parties; the social and Christian democratic parties accepted it, but the liberal parties refused. Di Rupo then tendered his resignation as formateur to the king, who implored him to keep trying to find a solution and gave him a few days to reconsider his resignation request. An agreement was reached on 26 November 2011, which meant that Di Rupo would not be resigning. The last details were negotiated on 30 November 2011, and the coalition partners reached an agreement on the allocation of ministries on 5 December 2011. The new government was sworn in on 6 December 2011. This brought the Belgian government formation to a conclusion after 541 days. It also ended what was believed to be the longest period in which a country has been without an elected government, at 589 days; Leterme had been serving as caretaker prime minister since his resignation on 26 April 2010.

== Speculation on the possible partition of Belgium ==
Towards the end of July 2011, party leaders of the Rattachist-separatist Walloon Rally (which does not have any seats in parliament) held talks with the Union for a Popular Movement of French President Nicolas Sarkozy and the French Socialist Party resulting that in the event of a split with Flanders, Wallonia could become the 28th region of France. In a poll of the French daily newspaper Le Figaro suggest that around half of Walloons and around 66% of French Republic citizens favour this plan. Belgian minister for Climate and Energy, Paul Magnette, also suggested incorporating Wallonia into Germany instead of France if the crisis in Belgium were to escalate.

== See also ==
- 2007–2008 Belgian government formation
- 2007–2011 Belgian political crisis
- 2010–2012 Bosnia and Herzegovina government formation
- 2014 Belgian government formation
- 2019–2020 Belgian government formation
