= 2007–2011 Belgian political crisis =

Political crisis

(Belgium) 2007–2011 Belgian political crisis

Timeline
- 2007 elections
  - 2007–2008 government formation
  - Verhofstadt III (interim)
  - Leterme I
  - Van Rompuy I
  - Leterme II
- 2010 elections
  - 2010–2011 government formation
  - Di Rupo I
  - Sixth state reform
See also
- Brussels-Halle-Vilvoorde
- Partition of Belgium
- State reform in Belgium
- Politics of Belgium
- Cabinet of Belgium

The 2007–2011 Belgian political crisis was a period of tense communal relations and political instability in Belgium, which was rooted in the differing opinions on state reform, and in the continued existence of the controversial electoral district of Brussels-Halle-Vilvoorde (BHV). Parties from the Dutch-speaking Flemish Community are in general strongly in favour for a devolution of powers to the communities and regions, and the splitting of the unconstitutional BHV district, while French-speaking French Community of Belgium is generally in favour of retaining the status quo. After the 2010 elections, the topics of public debt, deficit cuts and socio-economic reform were added to the debate, with most Flemish parties in favour of finding money by strongly reducing spending, whilst the proposals supported by most French-speaking parties also included a significant raise in taxes. The crisis came to an end in December 2011 with the inauguration of a new federal government which agreed on partition of the BHV district and on policies aimed at tackling the economic downturn. The country's continuing linguistic divide played a large part in the crisis. Several times during the period Belgium was threatened to be split up amid rising Flemish separatism.

The crisis broke out in the summer of 2007, following the electoral victory of the alliance of the Flemish Christian Democrats and the New Flemish Alliance, who supported a wide-reaching state reform and the immediate split of BHV. After 194 days of often heated negotiations, parties finally succeeded in forming a new government. In December 2008, another crisis related to the Fortis case, erupted, again destabilising the country and resulting in the resignation of Belgian Prime Minister Yves Leterme. The new Herman Van Rompuy-led government brought a brief period of fragile stability, but ended when Van Rompuy left his office to become the first full-term President of the European Council. The succeeding Leterme II Government fell in April 2010 over the lack of progress on resolving the BHV issue.

New elections were held in June 2010, where the separatist and conservative New Flemish Alliance won a landslide victory in Flanders, while the pro-unity Socialist Party won the elections in French-speaking Belgium. Due to the major differences between the two winning parties on a community and social-economic level, government negotiations and formation took a total of 541 days, breaking the world government formation record of 249 days, previously set by Iraq in 2010 as well as the ten months record set by Lebanon in 2014. On 13 September 2011 it was reported that Leterme aimed to take up a new job as deputy secretary general of the OECD in 2012, although that it seemed to be unlikely at that time that he'd leave the post as the head of the caretaker government before the end of the year. However, a new government was sworn in on 6 December 2011 with Elio Di Rupo as Prime Minister.

== 2007 federal elections and aftermath ==
=== Federal elections ===
Of the Flemish parties, the alliance of Christian Democratic and Flemish (CD&V) and the New-Flemish Alliance (N-VA) received an increased share of the vote from the previous election, held in 2003. The CD&V/N-VA list was headed by Yves Leterme, and became the largest political formation in Belgium, thus leading the coalition talks for a new government. The list campaigned heavily on the need for a far-reaching reform of the Belgian state.

In French-speaking Belgium, the liberal Reformist Movement managed to defeat the long-dominant Socialist Party (PS), although the PS remained strong.

=== Formation negotiations ===
After the election, a Christian democratic and liberal coalition was proposed. Because of the differing views on the need for a state reform on both sides of the language border, it took the parties 196 days, i.e. over 6 months, following the election, to form an interim government. That set a record as the longest Belgian government formation, one that has since been broken by the 2010 formation.

=== Verhofstadt III ===
On 17 December 2007, incumbent Prime Minister of Belgium Guy Verhofstadt was asked by the King of the Belgians Albert II to start the formation of an interim government that would last until 23 March 2008, when Leterme would take over. Belgium's political uncertainty intensified when Yves Leterme was hospitalised in February 2008. He remained in the hospital for several days but it was soon made clear that his health would not prevent him from assuming premiership.

A first preliminary deal was reached on 25 February 2008. It was agreed that some powers over industrial policy and housing would be transferred from the federal government to the regions. Measures would also be taken to strengthen inter-region cooperation; a second package of devolution changes would then be passed before the summer recess.

=== Leterme I ===
An official coalition agreement was signed on 18 March 2008. Yves Leterme was sworn in on 20 March 2008. In the late hours of 14 July 2008, after months of negotiations regarding the constitutional reform and electoral arrondissement Brussels-Halle-Vilvoorde failed and with the deadline of 15 July 2008 within reach, Leterme offered the resignation of his cabinet to King Albert II. After a series of consultations, King Albert II decided to reject Prime Minister Leterme's resignation on 17 July. The royal palace said that the King had asked two senior French-speaking politicians, Ministers of State François-Xavier de Donnea (MR) and Raymond Langendries (CdH), and the Minister-President of the German-speaking Community, Karl-Heinz Lambertz (SP), to establish how to start talks about institutional reform. They reported back to the King on 19 September 2008 with a one-page report so that neither of the communities would back out of the negotiations. Only a few hours later, Didier Reynders angered the Dutch-speaking politicians with controversial statements and so sparked a crisis within the Flemish government. On 21 September 2008, the N-VA withdrew its parliamentary support for the federal government, saying that the 15-month-long negotiations had failed to result in state reform. The withdrawal of support plunged the country into another crisis. Under pressure of the socialist and liberal coalition partners, the only N-VA minister in the Flemish government (Geert Bourgeois) resigned his post.

On 19 December 2008, Leterme again offered the resignation of the government to the king, who accepted the offer on 22 December. The resignation was offered after news broke out that the government had tried to intervene in the verdict of the Fortis case.

=== Van Rompuy I ===
After the resignation of Leterme and his cabinet, the King consulted various dignitaries and party leaders. He then appointed Wilfried Martens, a former prime minister and president of the European People's Party, to consult the various political parties and pave the way to a new "emergency" cabinet. The general consensus is that a government should run until the regional and European Parliament elections in June 2009 or, if possible, until the next federal election in 2011. On 28 December, King Albert II gave Herman Van Rompuy the task of forming a new government, which would include the current ruling parties. Van Rompuy and his government were sworn in on 30 December 2008.

=== Leterme II ===
On 24 April 2010, the government of Yves Leterme (who had replaced Van Rompuy again when Van Rompuy became President of the European Council) fell over the Brussels-Halle-Vilvoorde issue.

== 2010 federal elections and aftermath ==
=== Federal elections ===
An early election was held on 13 June 2010, resulting in the New Flemish Alliance (N-VA) winning most votes in the Flemish-speaking areas and the Socialist Party (PS) in French-speaking Belgium. Nationally the two parties were almost even with 27 seats for the N-VA and 26 for the PS, the remaining seats being split between ten other parties. Until 541 days after the elections, no agreement could be reached among the parties on a coalition to form a new government and during that period the country continued to be governed by an interim government. On 6 December 2011 the Di Rupo I Government was sworn in.

=== Formation negotiators ===
The various political parties had not succeeded in forming a new government for 541 days, which broke the 2007 record of the longest period without a government. During that period several people had made failed attempts to create an agreement, until Elio Di Rupo finally succeeded (in chronological order and all appointed by the King):

- Bart De Wever (Leader of N-VA) as informateur: 17 June 2010 – 8 July 2010
- Elio Di Rupo (Leader of PS) as pre-formateur: 9 July 2010 – 3 September 2010
- Danny Pieters (President of the Senate; N-VA) and André Flahaut (President of the Chamber of Representatives; PS) as mediators: 4 September 2010 – 5 October 2010
- De Wever as clarificator: 8 October 2010 – 18 October 2010
- Johan Vande Lanotte (Former Leader of SP.A) as mediator: 21 October 2010 – 26 January 2011
- Didier Reynders (Minister of Finance; Leader of MR) as informateur: 2 February 2011 – 1 March 2011
- Wouter Beke (Leader of CD&V) as negotiator: 2 March 2011 – 12 May 2011
- Di Rupo as formateur: 16 May 2011 – 6 December 2011
- Di Rupo as Prime Minister: since 6 December 2011

=== Provisions and speculation on the possible partition of Belgium ===
Towards the end of July 2011, as government formation had been dragging on for over a year, party leaders of the separatist Walloon Rally (which does not have any seats in parliament) have had talks with the Union for a Popular Movement party of French President Nicolas Sarkozy and the French Socialists. These talks resulted in that, in the event of the split with Flanders, Wallonia could become the 28th region of France. A poll of the French daily newspaper Le Figaro suggests that around half of Walloons and around 66% of French Republic citizens favour this plan.

The Belgian minister for Climate and Energy, Paul Magnette, also suggested to incorporate Wallonia into Germany instead of France if the crisis in Belgium were to escalate. Although over 71,000 people on the Walloon-German border speak German as their first language, the vast majority of Walloons are French speakers. Thus arises the possibility that, if Wallonia had become part of France, the German-speaking towns might have been absorbed by Germany.

=== Impact ===
A 2019 study found that the government formation deadlock did not harm economic growth in Belgium.
