= Leterme II Government =

Belgian federal government in 2009 and 2010

(Belgium) 2007–2011 Belgian political crisis

Timeline
- 2007 elections
  - 2007–2008 government formation
  - Verhofstadt III (interim)
  - Leterme I
  - Van Rompuy I
  - Leterme II
- 2010 elections
  - 2010–2011 government formation
  - Di Rupo I
  - Sixth state reform
See also
- Brussels-Halle-Vilvoorde
- Partition of Belgium
- State reform in Belgium
- Politics of Belgium
- Cabinet of Belgium

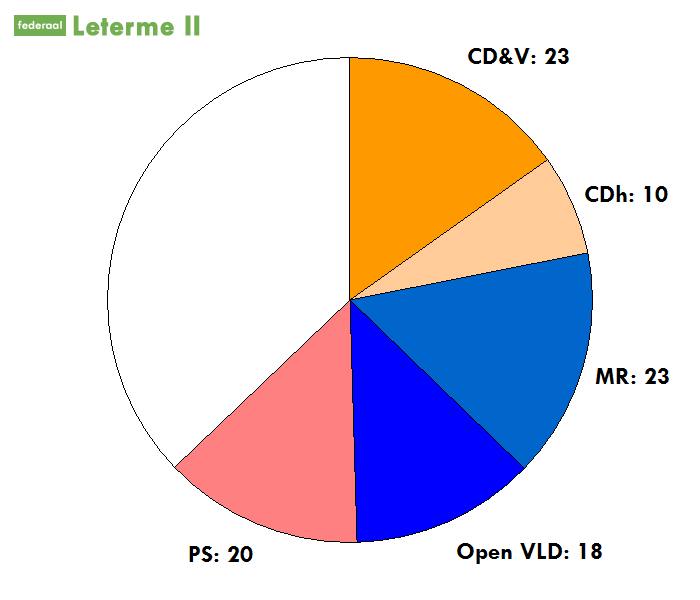

The Leterme II Government was the federal government of Belgium from 25 November 2009 to 26 April 2010, and the caretaker government until 6 December 2011. It took office when the Flemish Christian Democrat Yves Leterme (CD&V) was sworn in as Prime Minister. It followed the Van Rompuy I Government which ended when Herman Van Rompuy became the first President of the European Council. It comprised five parties: the Dutch-speaking Christian Democratic and Flemish (CD&V), the Dutch-speaking Open Flemish Liberals and Democrats (Open VLD), the French-speaking liberal Reformist Movement (MR), the French-speaking Socialist Party (PS) and the French-speaking Humanist Democratic Centre (CDH).

== Composition ==
The Leterme II Government originally comprised 15 ministers, seven secretaries of state, and a government commissary.

| Minister | Name | Party |
|---|---|---|
| Prime Minister | Yves Leterme | CD&V |
| Deputy Prime Minister – Finance and Institutional Reforms | Didier Reynders | MR |
| Deputy Prime Minister – Social Affairs and Public Health | Laurette Onkelinx | PS |
| Deputy Prime Minister – Budget | Guy Vanhengel | Open VLD |
| Deputy Prime Minister – Foreign Affairs and Institutional Reforms | Steven Vanackere | CD&V |
| Deputy Prime Minister – Employment and Equal Opportunities | Joëlle Milquet | CDH |
| Interior | Annemie Turtelboom | Open VLD |
| Self-employed, Agriculture and Scientific Policy | Sabine Laruelle | MR |
| Justice | Stefaan De Clerck | CD&V |
| Defence | Pieter De Crem | CD&V |
| Pensions and Big cities | Michel Daerden | PS |
| Development Cooperation and European Affairs | Olivier Chastel | MR |
| Climate and Energy | Paul Magnette | PS |
| Enterprise and Simplification | Vincent Van Quickenborne | Open VLD |
| the Civil Service and Public Companies | Inge Vervotte | CD&V |
| Secretary of State | Name | Party |
| Mobility (Prime Minister) | Etienne Schouppe | CD&V |
| Coordination of the Fight against Fraud (Justice) | Carl Devlies | CD&V |
| Finance (Finance) | Bernard Clerfayt | MR |
| Fight against Poverty (Social Affairs and Public Health) | Jean-Marc Delizée | PS |
| Disabled Persons (Social Affairs and Public Health) | Philippe Courard | PS |
| Budget (Budget) | Melchior Wathelet Jr. | CDH |

=== Changes in composition ===
On 14 February 2011, Charles Michel resigned as minister of Development Cooperation to become Chairman of the MR. He was replaced as minister in the Leterme II caretaker government by secretary of state for European Affairs Olivier Chastel, who became minister of Development Cooperation and European Affairs. Chastel was not replaced as secretary of state.

== Crisis ==
From the start of the Leterme I Government, the problem of the electoral district of Brussels-Halle-Vilvoorde caused problems between the coalition partners. The Constitutional Court of Belgium had judged in 2003 that the rules applying to the electoral district violated the non-discrimination principle. When no solution was found, the Open Flemish Liberals and Democrats quit the coalition. Leterme offered his resignation to King Albert II of Belgium on 22 April 2010. On 26 April 2010, after a final round of consultations by Didier Reynders failed, the king accepted the resignation. New elections were held on 13 June 2010. As of 26 April 2010 the Leterme II government became a caretaker government until it was succeeded by the Di Rupo I Government.
