= Sixth Belgian state reform =

(Belgium) 2007–2011 Belgian political crisis

Timeline
- 2007 elections
  - 2007–2008 government formation
  - Verhofstadt III (interim)
  - Leterme I
  - Van Rompuy I
  - Leterme II
- 2010 elections
  - 2010–2011 government formation
  - Di Rupo I
  - Sixth state reform
See also
- Brussels-Halle-Vilvoorde
- Partition of Belgium
- State reform in Belgium
- Politics of Belgium
- Cabinet of Belgium

The sixth state reform in the federal kingdom of Belgium is the result after the 2010–2011 Belgian government formation, with 541 days of negotiations, the longest ever in Belgium and possibly the world. The agreement was made among the Christian democratic CD&V and cdH, social democratic sp.a and PS, liberal Open Vld and MR and ecologist Groen! and Ecolo, each respectively a Flemish and French-speaking party. The first six parties, therefore not including the green parties, then formed the Di Rupo I Government. The Flemish nationalist party New Flemish Alliance, which became the largest after the 2010 elections, was notably not part of the agreement nor of the government coalition.

It is also called Butterfly Agreement (Dutch: Vlinderakkoord; French: Accord papillon), referring to the bow tie which Elio Di Rupo nearly always wears.

== Contents ==
Political reform

- The Belgian Senate will no longer be directly elected, but will instead become an assembly of regional parliaments, with fewer members.
- After Flanders and Wallonia as the Flemish and French-speaking Communities, the Brussels-Capital Region and German-speaking Community will also have constitutive autonomy.

Brussels and Brussels-Halle-Vilvoorde

- The electoral constituency of Brussels-Halle-Vilvoorde will be split.
- The judicial district of Brussels will be reformed.

Transfer of competences from the federal level to the communities and regions (competences in total worth € 17 billion per year)

- Regions will receive economic and employment competences, communities will be responsible for family policy.

Reform of the financing law

- The communities and regions will be financed differently and will have more fiscal autonomy.

Changes to the Powers of the Royal Family

- The children of the King will no longer be entitled to a seat in the Senate.

== See also ==
- 2007–2011 Belgian political crisis
- 2010–2011 Belgian government formation
- Di Rupo I Government
- State reform in Belgium
