= National Force (Belgium) =

Political party in Belgium

The National Force (French: Force Nationale, pronounced [fɔʁs nɑsjɔnal]) is a small Belgian francophone far right party. It split from the National Front in 2005 under the leadership of Paul Arku, Jacqeline Merveille, Senator Francis Detraux and Juan Lemmens. In the 2006 communal and provincial elections, the party won one council seat and two provincial parliament seats.
