= Di Rupo Government =

Belgium cabinet of 2011–2014

- 93rd Cabinet of Belgium (since 1830)

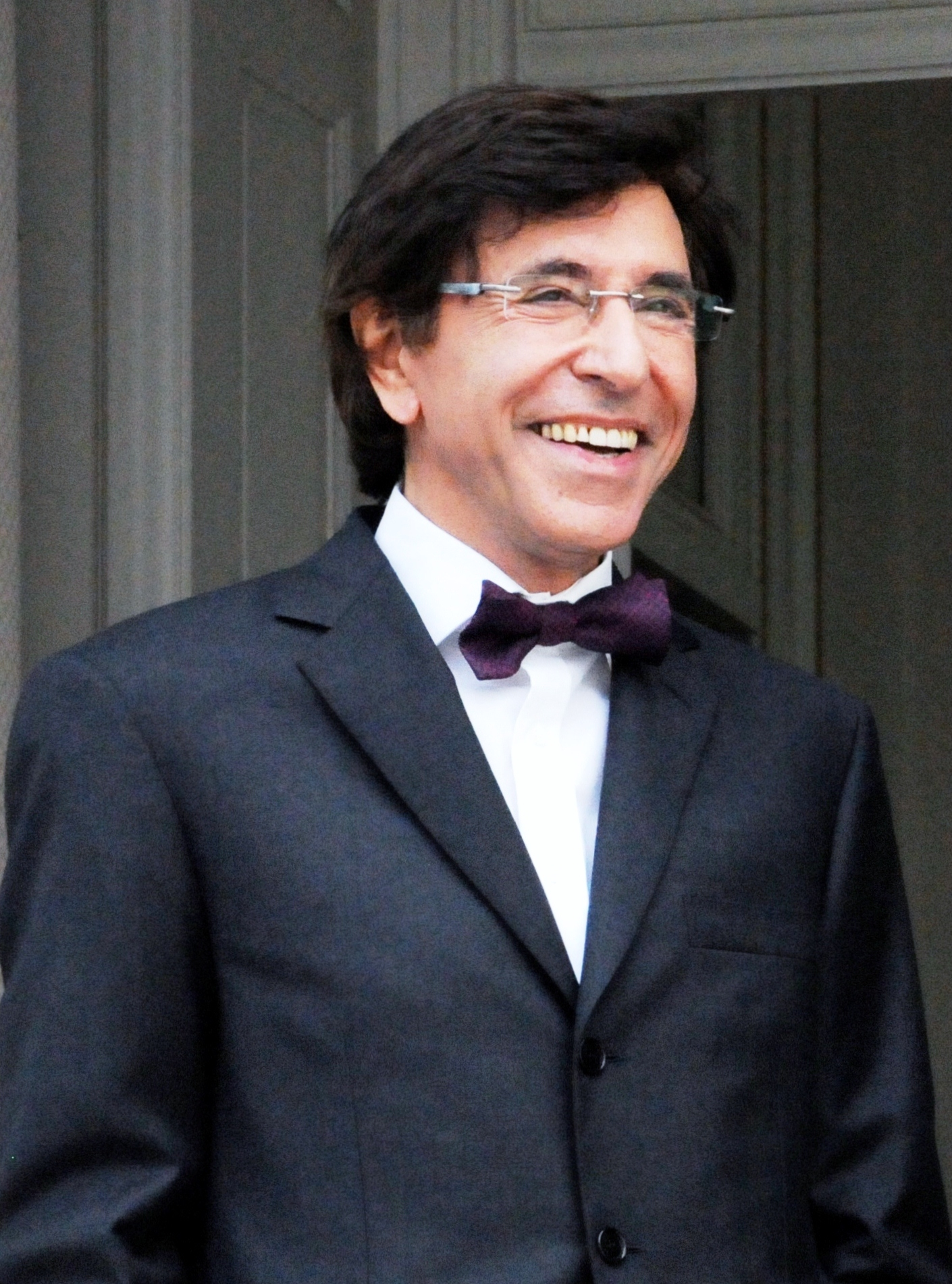
- Date formed: 6 December 2011
- Date dissolved: 11 October 2014

People and organisations
- Head of state: Albert II of Belgium; Philippe of Belgium
- Head of government: Elio Di Rupo
- Deputy head of government: See list: Pieter De Crem (Defence) Didier Reynders (Foreign Affairs, Foreign Trade and European Affairs) Johan Vande Lanotte (Economy, Consumer Affairs and the North Sea) Alexander De Croo (Pensions) Joëlle Milquet (Interior) Laurette Onkelinx (Social Affairs and Health)
- Member party: SP.A; PS; CD&V cdH; Open Vld; MR
- Status in legislature: Majority (coalition)

History
- Incoming formation: 2010–11 Belgian government formation
- Outgoing formation: 2014 Belgian government formation
- Election: 2010
- Predecessor: Leterme II
- Successor: Michel

The Di Rupo Government was the federal cabinet of Belgium sworn in on 6 December 2011, after a record-breaking 541 days of negotiations following the June 2010 elections. The government included social democrats (sp.a/PS), Christian democrats (CD&V/cdH) and liberals (Open Vld/MR), respectively of the Dutch and French language groups. The government notably excluded the New Flemish Alliance (N-VA), the Flemish nationalist party which achieved a plurality and became the largest party. Its absence, together with the unwillingness of Open Vld to enter into an eight-party coalition that included the green parties, caused the government coalition to lack a majority in the Dutch language group. It was the first time that the Belgian prime minister had been openly gay, as Di Rupo became the world's first male openly gay head of government (and second of any gender, after Iceland's Jóhanna Sigurðardóttir). Elio Di Rupo also became the first native French-speaking prime minister since 1979 and the first prime minister from Wallonia since 1974 and first socialist prime minister since 1974.

The negotiations aimed to put an end to the 2007–2011 Belgian political crisis and included a sixth state reform, including the partition of the electoral and judicial arrondissement of Brussels-Halle-Vilvoorde and the transfer of new powers from the federal level to the regions. Because a state reform requires a two-thirds majority, the green parties (Groen/Ecolo) participated in these negotiations but were not part of the government coalition.

== Formation ==
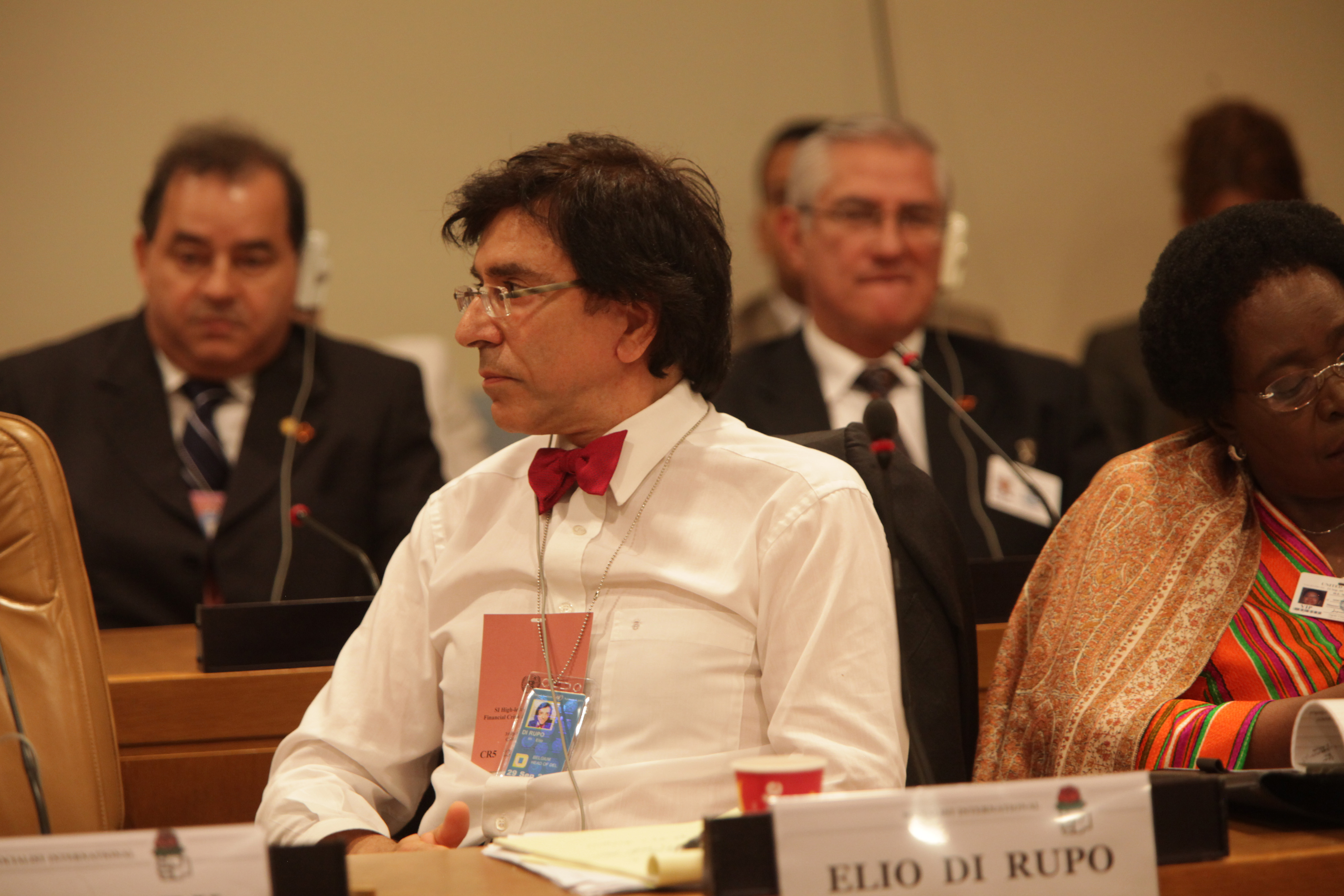
Elio Di Rupo

Following issues regarding the Brussels-Halle-Vilvoorde electoral district, the Open Flemish Liberals and Democrats quit the Leterme II Government, leading to early elections on 13 June 2010. In Flanders, the New Flemish Alliance (N-VA) became the biggest party while the Socialist Party (PS) prevailed in Wallonia. King Albert II appointed various politicians as mediators, including Bart De Wever, André Flahaut, Danny Pieters, Johan Vande Lanotte, Didier Reynders and Wouter Beke. Ultimately, Elio Di Rupo made a proposition which was refused by The New Flemish Alliance, but accepted by all other parties and as such they continued without the N-VA.

On 13 October 2011, it was decided that the green parties would not be part of the government but would support it in matters of confidence to achieve the two-thirds majority needed for state reform.

On 26 November 2011, the six remaining parties agreed on the national budget and agreed to the coalition on 3 December.

After more than 19 hours of negotiation, the parties involved came to an agreement on the allocation of ministries on 5 December 2011. The government was sworn in the next day. With 13 ministers and 6 secretaries of state, this government is one of the smallest by the number of ministers, not taking into account the secretaries of state.

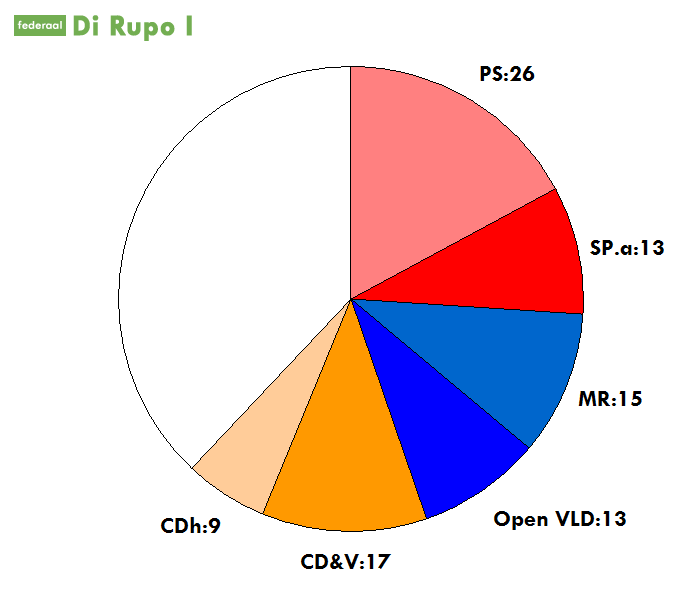
Government coalition

== Composition ==
Minister	Name	Party
Prime Minister	Elio Di Rupo	PS
Deputy Prime Minister – Minister of Defence	Pieter De Crem	CD&V
Deputy Prime Minister – Minister of Foreign Affairs, Foreign Trade and European Affairs	Didier Reynders	MR
Deputy Prime Minister – Minister of Economy, Consumer Affairs and the North Sea	Johan Vande Lanotte	sp.a
Deputy Prime Minister – Minister of Pensions	Alexander De Croo	Open Vld
Deputy Prime Minister – Minister of the Interior	Melchior Wathelet, Jr.	cdH
Deputy Prime Minister – Minister of Social Affairs and Health	Laurette Onkelinx	PS
Minister of the Middle Class, SMEs, Self-employed and Agriculture	Sabine Laruelle	MR
Minister of Finance and Sustainable Development	Koen Geens	CD&V
Minister of Public Enterprises and Development Cooperation	Jean-Pascal Labille	PS
Minister of Justice	Maggie De Block	Open Vld
Minister of Budget and Administrative Simplification	Olivier Chastel	MR
Minister of Employment	Monica De Coninck	sp.a
Secretary of State	Name	Party
Secretary of State for Environment, Energy and Mobility	Catherine Fonck	cdH
Secretary of State for Institutional Reform	Servais Verherstraeten	CD&V
Secretary of State for Civil Service and Modernisation of Public Services	Hendrik Bogaert	CD&V
Secretary of State for Combating Fraud	John Crombez	SP.a
Secretary of State for Social Affairs	Philippe Courard	PS

=== Changes in composition ===
Following the 2012 Belgian provincial and municipal elections, ministers Paul Magnette (PS) and Vincent Van Quickenborne (Open VLD) were both elected as mayor, of Charleroi and Kortrijk respectively. As a result, Van Quickenborne resigned on 17 October 2012 and was replaced as Deputy Prime Minister and Minister of Pensions by Alexander De Croo (Open VLD), who took the oath of office on 22 October 2012. Magnette remained in his position as Minister of Public Enterprises, Scientific Policy and Development Cooperation until 17 January 2013, when he formally resigned and his successor Jean-Pascal Labille (PS) became Minister of Public Enterprises and Development Cooperation. Secretary of state Philippe Courard (PS) took over the competence of Scientific Policy from Magnette.

On 5 March 2013 Steven Vanackere (CD&V) resigned as Deputy-Prime Minister and Minister of Finance after he was accused of lying to parliament about his knowledge regarding the financial agreements between the Algemeen Christelijk Werknemersverbond and Belfius. He was succeeded as Deputy Prime minister by Minister of Defense Pieter De Crem (CD&V) and as Minister of Finance by Koen Geens (CD&V).

After the 2014 elections on 22 July 2014 Joelle Milquet (CDh) resigned to become minister of Lower education and Culture in the Government of the French Community. She was replaced as Deputy-Prime Minister and Minister of the interior by Melchior Wathelet, Jr., who in turn was succeeded as state secretary of Environment, Energy, Mobility and Institutional Reforms by Catherine Fonck (CDh).

On 25 July 2014 Annemie Turtelboom (Open VLD) resigned as Minister of Justice to become Viceminister-president and Flemish minister of Finances, Budget and Energy. She was succeeded as minister of Justice by Maggie De Block (Open VLD).

On 12 September 2014 Philippe Courard (PS) resigned as Secretary of State for Social Affairs, Families, Disabled Persons and Scientific Policy in order to become leader of the PS faction in the Walloon Parliament. His competences were taken over by Minister Laurette Onkelinx (PS).

On 16 September 2014 John Crombez (SP.a) resigned as Secretary of State for Combating Social and Fiscal Fraud, effective 22 September, to become leader of the SP.a faction in the Flemish Parliament. His competences were taken over by Minister Johan Vande Lanotte (SP.a).
