= Formateur =

Politician who is appointed to form a government

A formateur (French for "someone who forms, who constitutes") is a politician who is appointed to lead the formation of a coalition government, after either a general election or the collapse of a previous government. The role of the formateur is especially important in the politics of Belgium, the Netherlands, Luxembourg, Italy, Israel, Czech Republic, and Spain. These countries have a parliamentary system, where the executive derives its mandate from majority support in the legislature. They also use proportional representation for elections to parliament, and have a multiparty system that makes it improbable for one party to win an outright majority. There may be several combinations of parties which might form a coalition. The formateur is traditionally appointed by the head of state but in the Netherlands that became the right of the Speaker of the House of Representatives in the early 21st century.

The formateur most often comes from the largest party in the future coalition (although an even larger party may remain in the opposition). They generally becomes prime minister if the formation process is successfully completed. Under a constitutional monarchy this appointment may be a reserve power of the monarch, and remains one of the rare moments when a mostly ceremonial monarch may play a significant political role. In game theory and political science, the term formateur party is used to describe the party that makes a proposal in a bargaining process, most often when modeling a government formation.

== Informateur ==
The formateur's work may be preceded by one or more informateurs, also appointed by the same authority as the formateur. The informateur is not expected to finalize a coalition, but attempts to find enough points of agreement to identify a likely coalition, from which a formateur is then selected to conclude a political program and compose a cabinet, usually headed by themselves. The informateur should be someone not otherwise considered for ministerial office, although some do obtain a portfolio in the future government. The role is often filled by a retired statesperson of some stature, often a former government minister or party leader. These positions are usually not described in any statute, but they tend to become part of political tradition. Informateurs have become customary in Belgium and the Netherlands since the 1950s.

== Netherlands ==
In the Netherlands, coalitions usually comprise up to four parties. Ever since the Netherlands adopted proportional representation in 1918, no party has even come close to winning an outright majority in the House of Representatives. Thus, the formation process is at least as, if not more, important than the election itself. The informateur, who researches the possible coalition options before a new cabinet is formed, is often a veteran politician, member of the Senate or Council of State. Often the informateur presides over talks with possible coalition partners, leading to a communal program, the coalition agreement. Sometimes, after the formation of a cabinet, the informateur becomes a minister. Once the informateur has found a potentially successful coalition, he goes back to the House, who appoints a formateur, who presides over the talks about the ministerial positions that are held between the parties that have already established a coalition agreement.

=== Subnational government ===
In provincial and municipal politics, a formateur can also be appointed. In the past, the negotiations were led by the largest party; but especially in tough negotiations, a formateur is appointed to be a "chairman" during the negotiations which is somewhat more neutral. The difference with a formateur on national level is that this local formateur does not report to the king, but to the mayor (municipal) or the King's Commissioner (provincial).
