= 2010 Belgian federal election =

- 13 June 2010
- Chamber of Representatives
- All 150 seats in the Chamber of Representatives; 76 seats needed for a majority
- Turnout: 89.22%
Party	Leader	Vote %	Seats	+/–
N-VA	Bart De Wever	17.40	27	+22
PS	Elio Di Rupo	13.70	26	+6
CD&V	Marianne Thyssen	10.85	17	−8
MR	Didier Reynders	9.28	18	−5
sp.a	Caroline Gennez	9.24	13	−1
Open Vld	Alexander De Croo	8.64	13	−5
Vlaams Belang	Bruno Valkeniers	7.76	12	−5
cdH	Benoît Lutgen	5.52	9	−1
Ecolo	Jean-Michel Javaux; Sarah Turine	4.80	8	0
Groen	Wouter Van Besien	4.38	5	+1
LDD	Jean-Marie Dedecker	3.74	1	−4
PP	Mischaël Modrikamen	1.29	1	New
This lists parties that won seats. See the complete results below.
- Senate
- 40 of 71 seats in the Senate
Party	Leader	Vote %	Seats	+/–
N-VA	Bart De Wever	19.61	9	+8
PS	Elio Di Rupo	13.62	7	+3
CD&V	Marianne Thyssen	9.99	4	−4
sp.a	Caroline Gennez	9.48	4	0
MR	Didier Reynders	9.27	4	−2
Open Vld	Alexander De Croo	8.24	4	−1
Vlaams Belang	Bruno Valkeniers	7.60	3	−2
Ecolo	Jean-Michel Javaux; Sarah Turine	5.46	2	0
cdH	Benoît Lutgen	5.13	2	0
Groen	Wouter Van Besien	3.89	1	0
This lists parties that won seats. See the complete results below.
- Maps

Federal Government before	Federal Government after
Leterme II Government	Di Rupo Government

Federal elections were held in Belgium on 13 June 2010, during the midst of the 2007–11 Belgian political crisis. After the fall of the previous Leterme II Government over the withdrawal of Open Flemish Liberals and Democrats (Open VLD) from the government the King dissolved the legislature and called new elections. The New Flemish Alliance, led by Bart De Wever, emerged as the plurality party with 27 seats, just one more than the francophone Socialist Party, led by Elio Di Rupo, which was the largest party in the Wallonia region and Brussels. It took a world record 541 days until a government was formed, resulting in a government led by Di Rupo.

Yves Leterme served as the caretaker prime minister of the country for the period that it had no official government.

== Background ==
=== Fall of the government ===
Following a continued lack of agreement over how to resolve the conflict over the electoral arrondissement of Brussels-Halle-Vilvoorde, the liberal Open VLD left the government on 22 April 2010, continuing the 2007–2011 Belgian political crisis. Prime Minister Yves Leterme (Christen-Democratisch en Vlaams, CD&V) immediately offered his resignation to King Albert II, who accepted it on 26 April 2010. Following the elections held on 13 June, there were fears that coalition-building may take so long that Belgium's presidency of the Council of the European Union, which starts on 1 July 2010, might have to start under a caretaker government.

=== Constitutionality of elections ===
According to a statement by the Flemish President of the Constitutional Court, Marc Bossuyt, the elections might be ruled unconstitutional unless the Brussels-Halle-Vilvoorde arrondissement is split up beforehand. On 4 May, all but one Flemish judge-president of the 13 Flemish Courts of First Instance wrote a collective letter, saying that the elections cannot be held with the current electoral districts and that a return to the previous electoral arrondissements is necessary. In contrast, Ghislain Londers, the president of the Court of Cassation declared that all judges are obliged to cooperate with the electoral process. Before the judges' letters, former president of the Belgian Chamber of Representatives Herman De Croo stated that no court could prevent the elections from taking place.

=== Importance of elections ===
The international media saw the election as crucial to determine the future of the country, even though it was admitted that devolution would not happen immediately.

== Date ==
The parliament was dissolved by Declaration of Revision of the Constitution on 7 May 2010 and elections were called by royal order of the same day. The period with rules and limits on campaign spending (sperperiode), which normally runs three months prior to election day, started that day.

Voting occurred on Sunday 13 June 2010 between 08:00 and 13:00 in polling stations with paper ballots, and between 08:00 and 15:00 in those with electronic voting.

The newly elected parliament was to convene on 6 July 2010.

== Parties ==
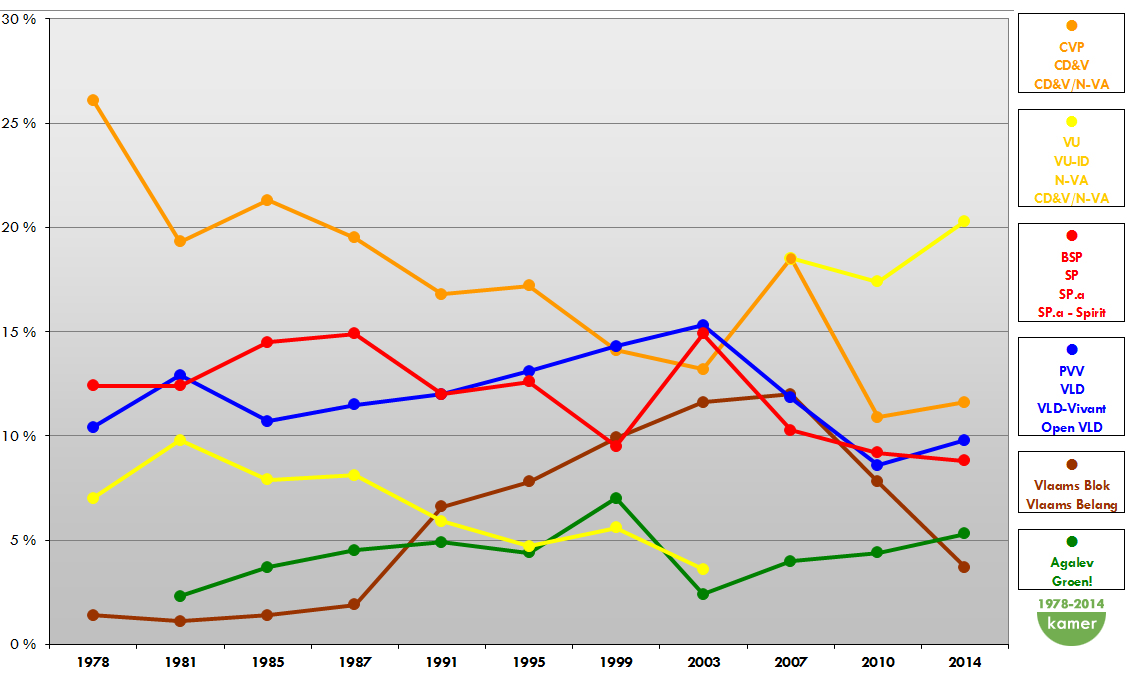
The primary six Flemish political parties and their results for the House of Representatives (Kamer). From 1978 to 2014, in percentages for the complete 'Kingdom'.

=== Flemish parties (Dutch speaking) ===
These Flemish parties field candidates in the regions of Flanders and the partially bilingual electoral district Brussels-Halle-Vilvoorde.

- New Flemish Alliance (Nieuw-Vlaamse Alliantie, N-VA) – centre-right political party, seeking secession of Flanders.
- Christian Democratic and Flemish (Christen-Democratisch en Vlaams, CD&V) – Christian democratic party with historic ties to both trade unionism and corporative organizations.
- Socialist Party – Differently (Socialistische Partij – Anders, sp.a) – social-democratic party.
- Open Flemish Liberals and Democrats (Open Vlaamse Liberalen en Democraten, open-VLD) – liberal party.
- Flemish Interest (Vlaams Belang) – seeking the independence of Flanders and strict limits on immigration.
- Green! (Groen!) – green political party.
- List Dedecker (Lijst Dedecker) – conservative-liberal party.

=== Walloon parties (French speaking) ===
These Francophone parties fielded candidates in the region of Wallonia and in the electoral district Brussels-Halle-Vilvoorde.

- Socialist Party (Parti Socialiste, PS) – social-democratic party.
- Reformist Movement (Mouvement Réformateur , MR) – liberal party.
- Humanist Democratic Centre (Centre Démocrate Humaniste, CDH) – Christian democratic party.
- Ecolo – green political party.
- People's Party (Parti Populaire) – conservative-liberal party.

== Candidates ==
Leterme stepped aside on 28 April 2010 and was replaced as leader of CD&V by Marianne Thyssen.

Notable newcomers in politics:

- Rik Torfs, former canon law professor at the Catholic University of Leuven, was on the Senate list for CD&V.
- Siegfried Bracke, former political analyst at the Flemish public broadcaster VRT was first on the Chamber list in East Flanders for N-VA.
- Eva Brems, human rights professor at Ghent University and former president of the Flemish division of Amnesty International. She was head of the Chamber list in Flemish Brabant for Groen!.

== Polls ==
As of May 26, it appeared that the major development in the election was the surge in popularity of the N-VA in Flanders. Led by Bart De Wever, it supports eventual independence for Flanders, and an immediate switch from a federal Belgium to a confederal Belgium. The N-VA replaces the CD&V of outgoing PM Yves Leterme as the most popular party in Flanders. This development opens the question of how the francophone parties might react to forming a government with an openly sovereigntist, but politically centrist party if they do win a plurality of votes in Flanders. It appeared that the N-VA had attracted some popularity from the ethnic nationalist party, Vlaams Belang.

		Flemish constituency							Francophone constituency						
Date	Source	CD&V	N-VA	Open VLD	SP–A	VB	Groen!	LDD	PS	MR–FDF	CDH	Ecolo	FN	PP	RWF
10 June 2007	2007 election	29.6%		18.8%	16.3%	19.0%	6.3%	6.5%	29.5%	31.2%	15.8%	12.8%	5.6%	/	/
29 March 2010	La Libre Belgique	20.0%	17.8%	13.8%	15.5%	17.3%	8.1%	5.5%	31.7%	20.5%	15.5%	20.2%	/	4.3%	/
4 May 2010	l'Avenir	18.9%	22.9%	14.8%	14.2%	12.5%	7.9%	3.9%	32.5%	21.1%	18.2%	17.6%	2.9%	<1%	2.0%
26 May 2010	Dimarso	19.5%	26.0%	12.4%	16.0%	10.3%	7.8%	5.4%							
28 May 2010	l'Avenir								33.0%	20.4%	17.0%	17.6%	2.5%	1.9%	1.9%
4 June 2010	Standaard/VRT	19.0%	25.2%	13.9%	13.8%	11.5%	8.2%	6.2%							
June 2010	La Libre Belgique	16.2%	26%	13.6%	16.3%	15%	6.8%	4.3%	30%	20.2%	16.1%	18.9%	4.1%	4.1%	/

== Results ==
After polls showed the N-VA receiving 29% of votes in their region, media interpreted the election as a "victory for Flemish independence". The following tables contain percentages on the national level (i.e. the result of N-VA is 17.4% on the national level, while it is 27.8% on the regional level).

=== Chamber of Representatives ===
Party	Votes	%	+/–	Seats	+/–
New Flemish Alliance	1,135,617	17.40	N/A	27	+22
Parti Socialiste	894,543	13.70	+2.84	26	+6
Christen-Democratisch en Vlaams	707,986	10.85	N/A	17	–8
Mouvement Réformateur	605,617	9.28	–3.24	18	–5
Socialistische Partij Anders	602,867	9.24	N/A	13	–1
Open Vlaamse Liberalen en Democraten	563,873	8.64	–3.19	13	–5
Vlaams Belang	506,697	7.76	–4.23	12	–5
Centre démocrate humaniste	360,441	5.52	–0.53	9	–1
Ecolo	313,047	4.80	–0.31	8	0
Groen!	285,989	4.38	+0.40	5	+1
Lijst Dedecker	150,577	2.31	–1.72	1	–4
Workers' Party of Belgium	101,088	1.55	+0.70	0	0
People's Party	84,005	1.29	New	1	New
Wallonie d'Abord	36,642	0.56	New	0	New
Rassemblement Wallonie France	35,743	0.55	+0.15	0	0
National Front	33,591	0.51	–1.45	0	–1
Front des gauches	20,734	0.32	New	0	New
BELG.UNIE	20,665	0.32	New	0	New
Front National+	11,553	0.18	New	0	New
Pro Bruxsel	7,201	0.11	New	0	New
Left Socialist Party	6,791	0.10	New	0	New
Parti Pensionné PP	6,688	0.10	New	0	New
Vivant	6,211	0.10	+0.01	0	0
Wallon+	5,857	0.09	New	0	New
EGALITE	5,670	0.09	New	0	New
RESPECT	5,630	0.09	New	0	New
Mouvement socialiste plus	2,827	0.04	New	0	New
MP Éducation	2,572	0.04	+0.02	0	0
Vital	2,259	0.03	+0.01	0	0
Pirate Party	2,200	0.03	New	0	New
Vrijheid	1,576	0.02	New	0	New
N	610	0.01	New	0	New
Total	6,527,367	100.00	–	150	0
Valid votes	6,527,367	94.19			
Invalid/blank votes	402,488	5.81			
Total votes	6,929,855	100.00			
Registered voters/turnout	7,767,552	89.22			
Source: IBZ

==== Details ====
===== Results by party (seats) =====
Region		Seats won per party							Total seats
	Constituency	N-VA	CD&V	SP.A	VLD	VB	GROEN!	LDD	Total seats
Flanders	(Antwerp Province) Antwerp	8 / 24	4 / 24	3 / 24	3 / 24	4 / 24	2 / 24	—N/a	24 / 88
Flanders	(Brussels) B.H.V.	3 / 9	2 / 9	1 / 9	2 / 9	1 / 9	—N/a	—N/a	9 / 88
Flanders	East Flanders	6 / 20	3 / 20	3 / 20	4 / 20	3 / 20	1 / 20	—N/a	20 / 88
Flanders	(Belgium) Leuven	2 / 7	1 / 7	1 / 7	1 / 7	1 / 7	1 / 7	—N/a	7 / 88
Flanders	(Limburg (Belgium)) Limburg	4 / 12	3 / 12	2 / 12	1 / 12	2 / 12	—N/a	—N/a	12 / 88
Flanders	West Flanders	4 / 16	4 / 16	3 / 16	2 / 16	1 / 16	1 / 16	1 / 16	16 / 88
Total		27 / 88	17 / 88	13 / 88	13 / 88	12 / 88	5 / 88	1 / 88	88 / 88
		PS	MR	CDH	ECOLO	PP			
Wallonia	(Brussels) B.H.V.	4 / 13	5 / 13	2 / 13	2 / 13	—N/a			13 / 62
Wallonia	(Hainaut Province) Hainaut	11 / 19	4 / 19	2 / 19	2 / 19	—N/a			19 / 62
Wallonia	(Liège Province) Liège	7 / 15	4 / 15	2 / 15	2 / 15	—N/a			15 / 62
Wallonia	(Luxembourg (Belgium)) Luxembourg	1 / 4	1 / 4	2 / 4	—N/a	—N/a			4 / 62
Wallonia	(Namur Province) Namur	2 / 6	2 / 6	1 / 6	1 / 6	—N/a			6 / 62
Wallonia	Walloon Brabant	1 / 5	2 / 5	—N/a	1 / 5	1 / 5			5 / 62
Total		26 / 62	18 / 62	9 / 62	8 / 62	1 / 62			62 / 62

===== Results by electoral constituencies (percentages) =====
Region		% won per party							
	Constituency	N-VA	CD&V	SP.A	VLD	VB	GROEN!	LDD	Others
Flanders	Antwerp	30.71	15.53	14.32	11.03	16.15	7.69	2.29	2.28
Flanders	B.H.V.	12.23	6.94	4.64	7.17	5.03	*	—	—
Flanders	East Flanders	28.15	15.40	14.15	17.40	12.33	7.36	3.19	2.04
Flanders	Leuven	27.05	16.26	17.79	14.51	9.61	9.79	3.14	1.86
Flanders	Limburg	28.83	18.81	18.14	12.10	12.79	4.81	2.89	1.62
Flanders	West Flanders	23.89	23.01	15.13	13.53	9.07	6.31	7.67	1.27
		PS	MR	CDH	ECOLO	PP			
Wallonia	B.H.V.	16.74	19.17	8.07	7.99	—			12.01*
Wallonia	Hainaut	48.18	17.52	11.47	9.41	2.75			10.67
Wallonia	Liège	35.79	22.30	13.93	13.83	3.08			11.07
Wallonia	Luxembourg	28.49	19.54	31.41	11.71	2.44			6.41
Wallonia	Namur	32.20	24.65	15.92	13.38	3.12			10.73
Wallonia	Walloon Brabant	22.48	35.79	12.89	16.33	5.04			7.47

=== Senate ===
Party	Votes	%	+/–	Seats	+/–
New Flemish Alliance	1,268,780	19.61	N/A	9	+8
Parti Socialiste	880,828	13.62	+3.37	7	+3
Christen-Democratisch en Vlaams	646,375	9.99	N/A	4	–4
Socialistische Partij Anders	613,079	9.48	N/A	4	0
Mouvement Réformateur	599,618	9.27	–3.04	4	–2
Open Vlaamse Liberalen en Democraten	533,124	8.24	–4.16	4	–1
Vlaams Belang	491,547	7.60	–4.29	3	–2
Ecolo	353,111	5.46	–0.36	2	0
Centre démocrate humaniste	331,870	5.13	–0.77	2	0
Groen!	251,546	3.89	+0.25	1	0
Lijst Dedecker	130,779	2.02	–1.36	0	–1
Workers' Party of Belgium	105,060	1.62	+0.80	0	0
People's Party	98,858	1.53	New	0	New
Wallonie d'Abord	62,251	0.96	New	0	New
Rassemblement Wallonie France	40,393	0.62	+0.14	0	0
Front des gauches	28,346	0.44	New	0	New
Vivant	15,462	0.24	New	0	New
Left Socialist Party	7,841	0.12	New	0	New
Committee for Another Policy	6,254	0.10	–0.10	0	0
Mouvement socialiste plus	3,981	0.06	New	0	New
Total	6,469,103	100.00	–	40	0
Valid votes	6,469,103	93.36			
Invalid/blank votes	460,375	6.64			
Total votes	6,929,478	100.00			
Registered voters/turnout	7,767,552	89.21			
Source: IBZ

=== Chamber of Representatives (geographically) ===
These maps depict the largest party in each constituency.

==== Dutch-speaking constituencies ====
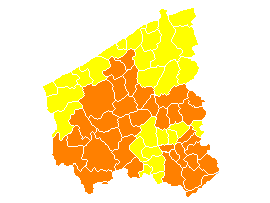
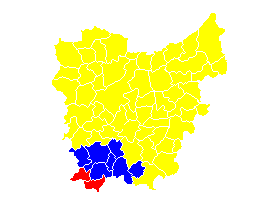
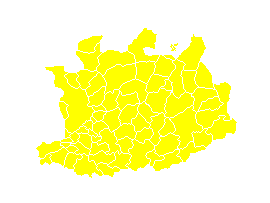
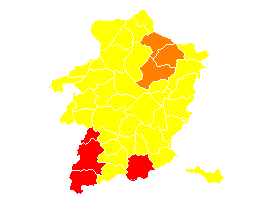
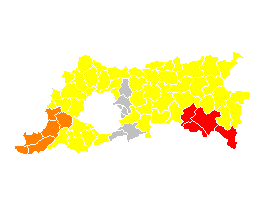
Legend:

- N-VA
- CD&V
- sp.a
- Open Vld
- MR

==== Brussels, French- & German-speaking constituencies ====
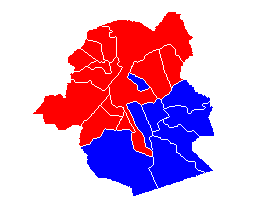
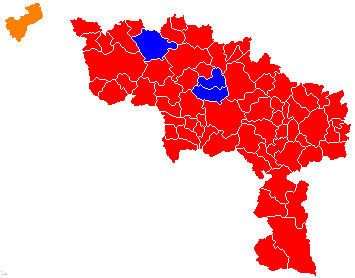
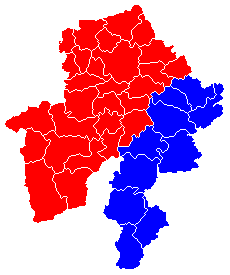
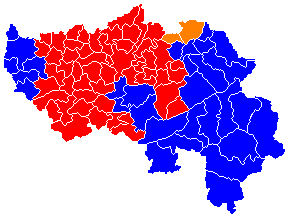
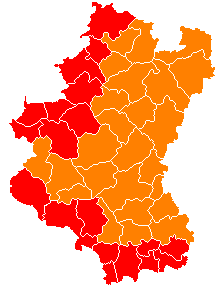
Legend:

- PS
- MR
- cdH

=== Most popular candidates ===
Candidates receiving the highest number of preferential votes.

For the Senate:
- 785,776 votes (19.63% of the Dutch electoral college) for Bart De Wever, N-VA
- 322,540 votes (8.06% of the Dutch electoral college) for Marianne Thyssen, CD&V
- 301,917 votes (7.54% of the Dutch electoral college) for Alexander De Croo, Open Vld
- 264,167 votes (10.71% of the French electoral college) for Paul Magnette, PS
- 200.024 votes (5.00% of the Dutch electoral college) for Filip Dewinter, Vlaams Belang

For the Chamber:
- 203,758 votes (28.19% of the constituency of Hainaut) for Elio Di Rupo, PS
- 101,940 votes (10.67% of the constituency of East Flanders) for Siegfried Bracke, N-VA
- 101,830 votes (12.97% of the constituency of West Flanders) for Yves Leterme, CD&V
- 78.951 votes (7.20% of the constituency of Antwerp) for Inge Vervotte, CD&V
- 72.194 votes (11.92% of the Constituency of Liège) for Michel Daerden, PS

== Government formation ==
On possible coalitions, election winner Bart De Wever announced he would seek negotiations with the Francophone Socialist Party. The Socialist Party leader Elio di Rupo was tapped to become the next Prime Minister, because the socialist parties emerged as the largest "party family" in the elections, and because the New Flemish Alliance lacks a Francophone counterpart.

Philip Blenkinsop of Reuters stated that the win of the New Flemish Alliance could have negative effects because "Belgium can ill afford drawn-out coalition talks because it has a large debt and any policy paralysis could make the country vulnerable on financial markets that are closely watching a sovereign debt crisis."

Coalition formation continued for a record-breaking 541 days, with a government under Elio Di Rupo eventually being formed on 6 December 2011 after agreement was reached on the 2012 budget. The Di Rupo I Government included the Liberal, Socialist and Christian Democratic parties from both Flanders and Wallonia. The government excludes the New Flemish Alliance (N-VA), the Greens of Groen and Ecolo, Vlaams Belang on the right, the Lijst Dedecker and the People's Party. N-VA's absence, together with the unwillingness of Open Vld to enter into an eight-party coalition that included the green parties, meant the government coalition lacked a majority in the Dutch language group. It was the first time that the Belgian prime minister has been openly gay and the world's first male openly gay head of government Belgium was thus the second European country to have a homosexual prime minister, after Iceland (Jóhanna Sigurðardóttir). Elio Di Rupo was the first native French-speaking prime minister since 1979 and the first Walloon prime minister since 1974.
