= State reform in Belgium =

Revision of Constitution of Belgium to provide equality to both Dutch and French people

State reform, in the context of Belgium, is the ongoing process of seeking and finding constitutional and legal solutions to the problems and tensions in the different segments of the Belgian population, mostly between the Dutch-speakers of Flanders and the French-speakers of Wallonia. In general, Belgium has evolved from a unitary state to a federal state with communities, regions, and language areas.

== Short overview ==
- First state reform (1970) – Cultural communities established (Flemish demand). Constitutional foundations for territorial regions (Walloon demand).
- Second state reform (1980) – Cultural communities become communities, with more powers related to personal matters. Territorial Flemish and Walloon regions established (Brussels Region later). Communities and regions get their own parliaments and governments.
- Third state reform (1988–1989) – Education transferred to communities. Brussels Region established.
- Fourth state reform (1993) – Belgium becomes a fully-fledged federal state. Communities and regions get more freedom and their parliaments are now directly elected.
- Fifth state reform (2001) – More powers to the regions (agriculture and oversight over local government). Refinancing of the communities and regions.
- Sixth state reform (2011) – More powers to the regions and communities. The constituency of Brussels-Halle-Vilvoorde was split. Refinancing of the communities and regions.

== Background ==
=== Language problems ===
The tensions between the communities of Belgium arose around a struggle between the country's two main language communities Dutch and French. That resulted in extensive language legislation but did not solve the conflicts between Flanders and Wallonia, the two main regions of the country. Widespread discrimination against Flemings, symbolized by the bad treatment of Flemish soldiers during World War I, made the Flemish organise against the mostly French-speaking government. After World War II, the differences between Dutch-speaking Belgians and French-speaking Belgians became clear in a number of conflicts.

In 1950, a referendum on the position of King Leopold III was held. The Royal Question was whether he should be allowed to return to the throne, in view of his position during World War II. Nationally, 58% of voters supported the restoration of Leopold III. However, there were strong regional differences. Of those who voted, 72% percent of the people in Flanders were in favor of his return, but 56% in Wallonia and 52% Brussels opposed his return. With the support of more than half of Belgians, Leopold III returned to the throne. Following his restoration, anger among Leopold's opponents in Wallonia and Brussels grew into rioting that the government had struggled to contain. Pressure from the government forced Leopold III to abdicate.

In 1960, the Catholic–Liberal government of Prime Minister Gaston Eyskens introduced a number of budget cuts. French-language trade unions went on strike against the cuts and against the government. They felt that a more regionalized system was needed to take the measures that Wallonia needed and that the Walloon interests were hurt by a Flemish majority in Belgium. They spoke of un état belgo-flamand, a Belgian-Flemish state. In response to the strikes, the government announced a regionalization of socio-economic policies.

Another tension between the language communities involved the Catholic University of Leuven. The university had for long been French-speaking, but Dutch played an increasingly important role in the 20th century. The tensions caused by the continued presence of a French-speaking section of the university grew through the 1960s and led to Flemish students rioting, supported by the population of the Flemish city of Leuven. A comment by a French-speaking social geographer of the university, who suggested that Leuven be included in the officially bilingual Brussels area, caused demonstrations from Flemish citizens and politicians; their main slogan was "Leuven Vlaams – Walen Buiten!" (Leuven Flemish, Walloons Out!) The tensions caused the collapse of the government of Prime Minister Paul Vanden Boeynants; the university was split into the Dutch-speaking Katholieke Universiteit Leuven and the French-speaking Université catholique de Louvain, united within a common governing body.

== History ==
=== 1970: First state reform ===
In 1970 was a first state reform, which resulted in the establishment of three cultural communities: the Dutch Cultural Community, the French Cultural Community and the German Cultural Community. The communities assumed responsibility for all cultural matters. Most importantly, they took over control of broadcasting and the use of the community language. This reform was a response to the Flemish demand for cultural autonomy. The constitutional revision of 1970 also laid the foundations for the establishment of Belgium's three Regions, which was a response to the demand of the Walloons and the French-speaking inhabitants of Brussels for economic autonomy. On 18 February 1970 Prime Minister Gaston Eyskens announced the end of "La Belgique de papa," a term used for the period of a unitary Belgium dominated by a French-speaking elite.

=== 1980: Second state reform ===
The second state reform took place in 1980, when the cultural communities became communities. The communities assumed the authority of the cultural communities with regard to cultural matters and became responsible for the 'matters relating to the person', such as health and youth policy. From then on, these three Communities were known as the Flemish Community, the French Community and the German-speaking Community.

Two regions were established as well in 1980: the Flemish Region and the Walloon Region. However, in Flanders it was decided in 1980 to immediately merge the institutions of the Community and the Region. Although the creation of a Brussels Region was provided for in 1970, the Brussels-Capital Region was not established until the third state reform.

=== 1988–1989: Third state reform ===
During the third state reform in 1988 and 1989, under Prime Minister Wilfried Martens, the Brussels-Capital Region was established with its own regional institutions, as well as Dutch and French institutions for community matters. The Brussels-Capital Region remained limited to 19 municipalities. Other changes included expanding the competencies of the communities and the regions. One notable responsibility that was transferred to the Communities during the third state reform is education.

=== 1993: Fourth state reform ===
Diagram of the Belgian Province of Brabant, which was divided into Flemish Brabant (bright yellow), Walloon Brabant (bright red), and the Brussels-Capital Region (orange).

The fourth state reform is called the "Sint-Michiels agreement" and took place in 1993 under Prime Minister Jean-Luc Dehaene. This reform consolidated the previous state reforms and turned Belgium into a full-fledged federal state. The first article of the Belgian Constitution was amended to read as follows, "Belgium is a Federal State which consists of communities and regions". During the fourth state reform, the responsibilities of the Communities and the Regions were expanded again, their resources were increased and they were given more fiscal responsibilities.

Other major changes included the direct election of the parliaments of the Communities and the Regions, the splitting up of the Province of Brabant into Flemish Brabant and Walloon Brabant, and the reform of the Federal Parliament's bicameral system and the relations between the Federal Parliament and the Federal Government. The first direct elections for the parliaments of the communities and the regions took place on 21 May 1995.

=== 2001: Fifth state reform ===
Two agreements came into effect following two special laws enacted on 13 July 2001. In 2001, a fifth state reform took place, under Prime Minister Guy Verhofstadt (Verhofstadt I Government), with the Lambermont and the Lombard accords.

==== Lambermont Accord ====
During the fifth state reform, more powers were transferred to the Communities and the Regions, with regard to agriculture, fisheries, foreign trade, development cooperation, auditing of electoral expenses and the supplementary financing of the political parties. The Regions became responsible for twelve regional taxes, and local and provincial government became a matter for the regions. The first municipal and provincial elections under the supervision of the Regions were the 2006 municipal elections.

==== Lombard Accord ====
The functioning of the Brussels institutions was also amended during the fifth state reform, which resulted among other things in a guaranteed representation of the Flemish inhabitants of Brussels in the Parliament of the Brussels-Capital Region.

=== 2011: Sixth state reform ===
- The electoral and judicial arrondissement of Brussels-Halle-Vilvoorde was divided.
- Competences worth €17 billion will be transferred from the federal level to the communities and regions. Regions will manage economic and employment matters, and communities will be responsible for family policy.
- The Belgian Senate will no longer be directly elected but instead become an assembly of regional parliaments, with fewer members.
