= Liège (Chamber of Representatives constituency) =

Parliamentary constituency in Belgium

- Luik; Lüttich
- Constituency for the Chamber of Representatives
- Location of Liège within Belgium
- Province: Liège
- Region: Wallonia
- Population: 1,122,925 (2025)
- Electorate: 810,049 (2024)
- Area: 3,857 km^{2} (2024)

Current Constituency
- Created: 2003
- Seats: List: 14 (2024–present); 15 (2003–2024)
- Members: List: Daniel Bacquelaine (MR); Frédéric Daerden (PS); Catherine Delcourt (MR); Simon Dethier (LE); Gilles Foret (MR); Luc Frank (LE); Philippe Goffin (MR); Isabelle Hansez (LE); Raoul Hedebouw (PTB); Christophe Lacroix (PS); Nadia Moscufo (PTB); Sarah Schlitz (Ecolo); Sophie Thémont (PS); Victoria Vandeberg (MR)
- Created from: List: Huy-Waremme; Liège; Verviers

Liège (Dutch: Luik; German: Lüttich) is one of the 11 multi-member constituencies of the Chamber of Representatives, the lower house of the Belgian Federal Parliament, the national legislature of Belgium. The constituency was established in 2003 following the re-organisation of constituencies across Belgium along provincial lines. It is conterminous with the province of Liège. The constituency currently elects 14 of the 150 members of the Chamber of Representatives using the open party-list proportional representation electoral system. At the 2024 federal election the constituency had 810,049 registered electors.

== Electoral system ==
Liège currently elects 14 of the 150 members of the Chamber of Representatives using the open party-list proportional representation electoral system. Seats are allocated using the D'Hondt method. Since 2003 only parties that reach the 5% threshold in the constituency compete for seats.

Electors may vote for the list (party) or for individual candidates, either main candidates or substitute candidates or a combination, on the list. They may vote for as many candidates as there are seats in the constituency. Split-ticket voting (panachage) is not permitted and will result in the ballot paper being invalidated. The minimum number of votes a candidate must obtain to get elected - the quotient - is calculated as the total votes received by the party divided by the number of seats in the constituency plus one. Half the ballot papers where there are no votes for main candidates (i.e. the elector has voted for the list or for substitute candidates only) are redistributed amongst main candidates in the order they appear on the ballot paper so that the candidate's total votes (personal votes plus redistributed votes) equals the quotient. The seats won by the party are then allocated to the candidates with the most number of total votes.

== Election results ==
=== Summary ===
Election	Workers PTB			Ecolo Ecolo			Socialists PS			Democratic Federalists DéFI / FDF			Reformists MR			Les Engagés LE / CDH			Chez Nous Chez Nous / PP			National Front FN		
Election	Votes	%	Seats	Votes	%	Seats	Votes	%	Seats	Votes	%	Seats	Votes	%	Seats	Votes	%	Seats	Votes	%	Seats	Votes	%	Seats
2024	91,188	14.43%	2	49,936	7.90%	1	137,443	21.75%	3	13,816	2.19%	0	179,296	28.37%	5	103,711	16.41%	3	21,877	3.46%	0			
2019	101,860	16.45%	3	95,878	15.48%	3	154,232	24.91%	5	22,313	3.60%	0	121,732	19.66%	3	52,167	8.43%	1	21,998	3.55%	0			
2014	50,603	8.08%	1	56,890	9.08%	1	187,897	30.00%	5	13,915	2.22%	0	158,046	25.23%	5	81,759	13.05%	2	32,229	5.15%	1			
2010	18,706	3.09%	0	83,791	13.83%	2	216,827	35.79%	7				135,118	22.30%	4	84,393	13.93%	2	18,642	3.08%	0			
2007	6,323	1.01%	0	84,604	13.55%	2	200,450	32.10%	6				190,699	30.54%	5	88,874	14.23%	2				28,177	4.51%	0
2003	4,606	0.76%	0	46,026	7.58%	1	216,293	35.62%	6				186,582	30.73%	6	91,469	15.06%	2				29,134	4.80%	0

(Figures in italics represent alliances.)

=== Detailed ===
==== 2024 ====
Results of the 2024 federal election held on 9 June 2024:

Party		Votes per arrondissement					Total votes	%	Seats
Party		Huy	Liège	Ver- viers	War- emme	Expat- riates	Total votes	%	Seats
Reformist Movement	MR	20,015	84,374	53,806	18,294	2,807	179,296	28.37%	5
Socialist Party	PS	15,736	83,129	26,125	10,813	1,640	137,443	21.75%	3
Les Engagés	LE	12,710	48,543	31,257	10,080	1,121	103,711	16.41%	3
Workers' Party of Belgium	PTB	8,988	59,506	16,236	5,692	766	91,188	14.43%	2
Ecolo	Ecolo	6,213	24,768	13,634	3,017	2,304	49,936	7.90%	1
Chez Nous	Chez Nous	2,256	11,978	5,714	1,673	256	21,877	3.46%	0
DéFI	DéFI	1,773	8,034	2,619	1,182	208	13,816	2.19%	0
New Flemish Alliance	N-VA	1,171	5,145	3,258	987	279	10,840	1.72%	0
Blank Party	PB	1,301	5,818	2,558	881	98	10,656	1.69%	0
Citizen Collective	CC	1,100	4,493	1,762	703	231	8,289	1.31%	0
Citizen Recovery	RMC	315	1,627	980	362	77	3,361	0.53%	0
Belgische Unie – Union Belge	BUB	151	751	428	119	53	1,502	0.24%	0
Valid votes		71,729	338,166	158,377	53,803	9,840	631,915	100.00%	14
Rejected votes		5,318	26,472	17,286	4,005	699	53,780	7.84%	
Total polled		77,047	364,638	175,663	57,808	10,539	685,695	84.65%	
Registered electors		88,420	431,940	204,283	64,805	20,601	810,049		
Turnout		87.14%	84.42%	85.99%	89.20%	51.16%	84.65%		

The following candidates were elected: Daniel Bacquelaine (MR), 11,260 votes; Frédéric Daerden (PS), 44,458 votes; Catherine Delcourt (MR), 13,228 votes; Gilles Foret (MR), 11,204 votes; Luc Frank (LE), 8,317 votes; Philippe Goffin (MR), 18,331 votes; Isabelle Hansez (LE), 7,839 votes; Raoul Hedebouw (PTB), 42,328 votes; Pierre-Yves Jeholet (MR), 64,306 votes; Christophe Lacroix (PS), 11,879 votes; Vanessa Matz (LE), 22,701 votes; Nadia Moscufo (PTB), 6,709 votes; Sarah Schlitz (Ecolo), 11,359 votes; and Sophie Thémont (PS), 11,363 votes.

Substitutions:

- Vanessa Matz (LE) was appointed to the federal government and was substituted by Simon Dethier (LE) on 4 February 2025.
- Pierre-Yves Jeholet (MR) was appointed to the Government of Wallonia and was substituted by Victoria Vandeberg (MR) on 4 February 2025.

==== 2019 ====
Results of the 2019 federal election held on 26 May 2019:

Party		Votes per arrondissement					Total votes	%	Seats
Party		Huy	Liège	Ver- viers	War- emme	Expat- riates	Total votes	%	Seats
Socialist Party	PS	18,786	94,675	27,493	13,043	235	154,232	24.91%	5
Reformist Movement	MR	12,996	57,985	37,190	13,171	390	121,732	19.66%	3
Workers' Party of Belgium	PTB	10,684	65,845	18,365	6,865	101	101,860	16.45%	3
Ecolo	Ecolo	11,943	50,175	26,746	6,560	454	95,878	15.48%	3
Humanist Democratic Centre	CDH	4,580	21,836	21,859	3,821	71	52,167	8.43%	1
DéFI	DéFI	2,784	12,895	4,546	2,061	27	22,313	3.60%	0
People's Party	PP	2,029	11,794	6,567	1,563	45	21,998	3.55%	0
Belgians First		1,123	5,840	2,713	778	9	10,463	1.69%	0
Destexhe List		1,057	5,438	1,993	798	24	9,310	1.50%	0
DierAnimal		959	4,881	1,792	744	16	8,392	1.36%	0
Citizen Collective	CC	1,492	3,653	1,501	737	12	7,395	1.19%	0
Vlaams Belang	VB	357	1,771	1,595	356	14	4,093	0.66%	0
The Right		371	1,923	1,388	241	26	3,949	0.64%	0
Rebellious Wallonia		364	1,824	745	320	13	3,266	0.53%	0
Nation		172	1,342	497	120	6	2,137	0.35%	0
Valid votes		69,697	341,877	154,990	51,178	1,443	619,185	100.00%	15
Rejected votes		5,664	27,115	18,972	4,222	121	56,094	8.31%	
Total polled		75,361	368,992	173,962	55,400	1,564	675,279	85.01%	
Registered electors		85,868	441,510	202,759	62,141	2,100	794,378		
Turnout		87.76%	83.58%	85.80%	89.15%	74.48%	85.01%		

The following candidates were elected: Daniel Bacquelaine (MR), 27,220 votes; Julie Chanson (Ecolo), 8,035 votes; Samuel Cogolati (Ecolo), 6,755 votes; Gaby Colebunders (PTB), 3,524 votes; Laura Crapanzano (PS), 10,850 votes; Frédéric Daerden (PS), 54,898 votes; Julie Fernandez-Fernandez (PS), 16,648 votes; Marc Goblet (PS), 9,504 votes; Philippe Goffin (MR), 14,717 votes; Raoul Hedebouw (PTB), 49,852 votes; Kattrin Jadin (MR), 17,015 votes; Christophe Lacroix (PS), 17,094 votes; Vanessa Matz (CDH), 12,561 votes; Nadia Moscufo (PTB), 7,411 votes; and Sarah Schlitz (Ecolo), 17,728 votes.

Substitutions:

- Laura Crapanzano (PS) resigned on 19 June 2019 and was substituted by Sophie Thémont (PS) on 20 June 2019.
- Julie Fernandez-Fernandez (PS) resigned on 19 June 2019 and was substituted by Malik Ben Achour (PS) on 20 June 2019.
- Frédéric Daerden (PS) was appointed to the Government of the French Community and was substituted by Hervé Rigot (PS) between 19 September 2019 and 1 July 2021; and by Chanelle Bonaventure (PS) from 1 July 2021.
- Marc Goblet (PS) died on 16 June 2021 and was substituted by Hervé Rigot (PS) on 1 July 2021.
- Kattrin Jadin (MR) resigned on 22 September 2022 and was substituted by Mathieu Bihet (MR) on the same day.

==== 2014 ====
Results of the 2014 federal election held on 25 May 2014:

Party		Votes per arrondissement					Total votes	%	Seats
Party		Huy	Liège	Ver- viers	War- emme	Expat- riates	Total votes	%	Seats
Socialist Party	PS	24,046	113,076	34,353	16,045	377	187,897	30.00%	5
Reformist Movement	MR	17,992	76,936	47,173	15,638	307	158,046	25.23%	5
Humanist Democratic Centre	CDH	8,676	36,885	30,103	5,976	119	81,759	13.05%	2
Ecolo	Ecolo	9,023	27,846	16,123	3,716	182	56,890	9.08%	1
Workers' Party of Belgium	PTB	4,822	37,400	5,748	2,614	19	50,603	8.08%	1
People's Party	PP	3,223	17,087	9,782	2,112	25	32,229	5.15%	1
Francophone Democratic Federalists	FDF	1,821	8,106	2,752	1,215	21	13,915	2.22%	0
Debout Les Belges!		936	5,885	1,962	587	11	9,381	1.50%	0
The Right		1,136	4,613	2,355	589	21	8,714	1.39%	0
Wallonia First		790	4,011	1,059	414	21	6,295	1.01%	0
Islam		82	3,367	823	46	14	4,332	0.69%	0
Pirate		420	2,196	1,063	250	9	3,938	0.63%	0
Pensioners Party	PP	365	1,840	755	217	1	3,178	0.51%	0
Nation		195	1,583	393	169	2	2,342	0.37%	0
Citizen Liberal Values	VLC	433	748	526	110	3	1,820	0.29%	0
Rassemblement Wallonie France	RWF	305	836	332	146	3	1,622	0.26%	0
Belgische Unie – Union Belge	BUB	221	559	302	104	12	1,198	0.19%	0
Left Movement	MG	77	697	216	33	1	1,024	0.16%	0
Walloon Front	FW	41	605	86	20	0	752	0.12%	0
CIM		134	210	71	15	0	430	0.07%	0
Valid votes		74,738	344,486	155,977	50,016	1,148	626,365	100.00%	15
Rejected votes		5,468	20,164	17,941	3,775	84	47,432	7.04%	
Total polled		80,206	364,650	173,918	53,791	1,232	673,797	86.42%	
Registered electors		92,847	425,429	200,290	59,531	1,595	779,692		
Turnout		86.39%	85.71%	86.83%	90.36%	77.24%	86.42%		

The following candidates were elected: Daniel Bacquelaine (MR), 46,230 votes; Aldo Carcaci (PP), 6,282 votes; Caroline Cassart-Mailleux (MR), 13,169 votes; Frédéric Daerden (PS), 30,484 votes; Willy Demeyer (PS), 45,590 votes; Julie Fernandez-Fernandez (PS), 15,959 votes; Gilles Foret (MR), 14,760 votes; André Frédéric (PS), 11,242 votes; Muriel Gerkens (Ecolo), 12,883 votes; Philippe Goffin (MR), 15,664 votes; Raoul Hedebouw (PTB), 16,586 votes; Kattrin Jadin (MR), 19,742 votes; Alain Mathot (PS), 20,523 votes; Vanessa Matz (CDH), 10,205 votes; and Melchior Wathelet Jr. (CDH), 34,780 votes.

Substitutions:

- Daniel Bacquelaine (MR) was appointed to the federal government and was substituted by Luc Gustin (MR) on 14 October 2014.
- Melchior Wathelet Jr. (CDH) resigned on 20 April 2015 and was substituted by Michel de Lamotte (CDH) on 23 April 2015.

==== 2010 ====
Results of the 2010 federal election held on 13 June 2010:

Party		Votes per arrondissement					Total votes	%	Seats
Party		Huy	Liège	Ver- viers	War- emme	Expat- riates	Total votes	%	Seats
Socialist Party	PS	23,850	136,100	39,182	17,489	206	216,827	35.79%	7
Reformist Movement	MR	14,167	68,058	39,248	13,343	302	135,118	22.30%	4
Humanist Democratic Centre	CDH	8,172	40,105	30,152	5,834	130	84,393	13.93%	2
Ecolo	Ecolo	12,855	42,229	22,305	6,166	236	83,791	13.83%	2
Workers' Party of Belgium	PTB	1,404	14,693	1,836	766	7	18,706	3.09%	0
People's Party	PP	1,857	9,912	5,238	1,616	19	18,642	3.08%	0
Wallonia First		1,295	4,814	2,208	818	35	9,170	1.51%	0
Rassemblement Wallonie France	RWF	1,233	4,417	2,043	768	13	8,474	1.40%	0
Left Front		741	4,220	1,511	352	9	6,833	1.13%	0
Pensioners Party	PP	481	4,740	1,160	303	4	6,688	1.10%	0
Vivant	Vivant	333	1,475	4,131	257	15	6,211	1.03%	0
Belgische Unie – Union Belge	BUB	550	2,910	1,548	379	42	5,429	0.90%	0
MP Éducation		86	1,564	848	69	5	2,572	0.42%	0
Wallon+	W+	144	1,148	296	82	5	1,675	0.28%	0
Socialist Movement Plus	MS+	568	508	162	53	2	1,293	0.21%	0
Valid votes		67,736	336,893	151,868	48,295	1,030	605,822	100.00%	15
Rejected votes		5,018	17,677	16,227	3,525	81	42,528	6.56%	
Total polled		72,754	354,570	168,095	51,820	1,111	648,350	86.43%	
Registered electors		82,619	414,009	194,935	57,368	1,171	750,102		
Turnout		88.06%	85.64%	86.23%	90.33%	94.88%	86.43%		

The following candidates were elected: Daniel Bacquelaine (MR), 17,777 votes; Guy Coëme (PS), 20,038 votes; Michel Daerden (PS), 72,194 votes; Julie Fernandez-Fernandez (PS), 10,069 votes; André Frédéric (PS), 11,760 votes; Muriel Gerkens (Ecolo), 14,657 votes; Philippe Goffin (MR), 9,153 votes; Kattrin Jadin (MR), 15,515 votes; Éric Jadot (Ecolo), 5,782 votes; Marie-Claire Lambert (PS), 9,945 votes; Mauro Lenzini (PS), 8,487 votes; Alain Mathot (PS), 42,730 votes; Didier Reynders (MR), 61,848 votes; Marie-Dominique Simonet (CDH), 19,346 votes; and Melchior Wathelet Jr. (CDH), 30,563 votes.

Substitutions:

- Marie-Dominique Simonet (CDH) resigned on 28 June 2010 and was substituted by Joseph George (CDH) on 6 July 2010.
- Mauro Lenzini (PS) resigned on 5 July 2010 and was substituted by Linda Musin (PS) on 6 July 2010.
- Didier Reynders (MR) was appointed to the federal government and was substituted by Luc Gustin (MR) on 7 December 2011.
- Guy Coëme (PS) resigned on 25 October 2012 and was substituted by Christophe Lacroix (PS) on the same day.
- Thierry Giet (PS) resigned on 24 June 2013 and was substituted by Véronique Bonni (PS) on 26 June 2013.
- Melchior Wathelet Jr. (CDH) was appointed to the federal government and was substituted by Benoît Drèze (CDH) on 17 July 2013.

==== 2007 ====
Results of the 2007 federal election held on 10 June 2007:

Party		Votes per arrondissement					Total votes	%	Seats
Party		Huy	Liège	Ver- viers	War- emme	Expat- riates	Total votes	%	Seats
Socialist Party	PS	22,717	125,766	35,217	16,496	254	200,450	32.10%	6
Reformist Movement	MR	21,280	98,656	52,606	17,710	447	190,699	30.54%	5
Humanist Democratic Centre	CDH	8,591	40,622	33,964	5,528	169	88,874	14.23%	2
Ecolo	Ecolo	14,569	44,206	19,917	5,652	260	84,604	13.55%	2
National Front	FN	2,732	16,186	7,671	1,549	39	28,177	4.51%	0
Workers' Party of Belgium	PTB	292	5,339	481	203	8	6,323	1.01%	0
Rassemblement Wallonie France	RWF	679	2,839	1,261	354	12	5,145	0.82%	0
Communist Party of Wallonia	PC	646	1,999	1,031	297	20	3,993	0.64%	0
Wallon		407	2,164	461	142	26	3,200	0.51%	0
Vivant	Vivant	245	1,265	1,541	125	5	3,181	0.51%	0
Federal Christian Democrats	CDF	261	1,327	715	96	25	2,424	0.39%	0
New Belgian Front	FNB	183	903	601	141	5	1,833	0.29%	0
National Force		222	685	580	111	22	1,620	0.26%	0
Committee for Another Policy	CAP	145	1,027	222	71	3	1,468	0.24%	0
MP Éducation		86	815	418	32	11	1,362	0.22%	0
Union for a Popular Movement – Belgium	UMP-B	106	857	106	36	1	1,106	0.18%	0
Valid votes		73,161	344,656	156,792	48,543	1,307	624,459	100.00%	15
Rejected votes		4,706	15,483	13,943	2,974	151	37,257	5.63%	
Total polled		77,867	360,139	170,735	51,517	1,458	661,716	89.07%	
Registered electors		87,403	407,730	190,564	55,521	1,678	742,896		
Turnout		89.09%	88.33%	89.59%	92.79%	86.89%	89.07%		

The following candidates were elected: Daniel Bacquelaine (MR), 18,435 votes; Guy Coëme (PS), 29,126 votes; Michel Daerden (PS), 92,922 votes; André Frédéric (PS), 10,764 votes; Muriel Gerkens (Ecolo), 14,866 votes; Philippe Henry (Ecolo), 7,106 votes; Kattrin Jadin (MR), 14,765 votes; Hervé Jamar (MR), 19,235 votes; Pierre-Yves Jeholet (MR), 20,046 votes; Marie-Claire Lambert (PS), 9,096 votes; Alain Mathot (PS), 24,574 votes; Linda Musin (PS), 9,851 votes; Didier Reynders (MR), 102,762 votes; Marie-Dominique Simonet (CDH), 21,482 votes; and Melchior Wathelet Jr. (CDH), 28,538 votes.

Substitutions:

- Hervé Jamar (MR) resigned on 27 June 2007 and was substituted by Olivier Hamal (MR).
- Michel Daerden (PS) was appointed to the Government of the French Community and Government of Wallonia and was substituted by Thierry Giet (PS) between 5 July 2007 and 22 June 2009.
- Marie-Dominique Simonet (CDH) was appointed to the Government of the French Community and Government of Wallonia and was substituted by Joseph George (CDH) between 5 July 2007 and 22 June 2009.
- Didier Reynders (MR) was appointed to the federal government and was substituted by Josée Lejeune (MR) between 21 December 2007 and 22 June 2009.
- Melchior Wathelet Jr. (CDH) was appointed Secretary of State in the federal government and was substituted by Marie-Martine Schyns (CDH) from 20 March 2008.
- Michel Daerden (PS) resigned on 23 June 2009 and was substituted by Thierry Giet (PS) on 25 June 2009.
- Marie-Dominique Simonet (CDH) resigned on 23 June 2009 and was substituted by Joseph George (CDH) on 25 June 2009.
- Pierre-Yves Jeholet (MR) resigned on 23 June 2009 and was substituted by Josée Lejeune (MR) on 25 June 2009.
- Didier Reynders (MR) was appointed to the federal government and was substituted by Luc Gustin (MR) from 25 June 2009.
- Philippe Henry (Ecolo) was appointed to the Government of Wallonia and was substituted by Éric Jadot (Ecolo) from 16 July 2009.

==== 2003 ====
Results of the 2003 federal election held on 18 May 2003:

Party		Votes per arrondissement					Total votes	%	Seats
Party		Huy	Liège	Ver- viers	War- emme	Expat- riates	Total votes	%	Seats
Socialist Party	PS	25,432	134,115	39,909	16,582	255	216,293	35.62%	6
Reformist Movement	MR	22,029	94,919	52,306	16,819	509	186,582	30.73%	6
Humanist Democratic Centre	CDH	9,141	43,992	32,409	5,770	157	91,469	15.06%	2
Ecolo	Ecolo	6,529	25,206	11,206	2,845	240	46,026	7.58%	1
National Front	FN	2,958	17,976	6,578	1,590	32	29,134	4.80%	0
Vivant	Vivant	1,163	4,850	4,302	632	24	10,971	1.81%	0
Federal Christian Democrats	CDF	813	3,533	2,570	484	35	7,435	1.22%	0
Rassemblement Wallonie France	RWF	802	2,648	1,366	360	16	5,192	0.86%	0
Workers' Party of Belgium	PTB	346	3,419	671	156	14	4,606	0.76%	0
French People United in a National; Action of Co-operation and Emancipation	FRANCE	329	1,617	512	162	13	2,633	0.43%	0
Communist Party and Resistance, Democracy, Socialism	PC/RDS	182	1,896	354	84	6	2,522	0.42%	0
Socialist Movement	MS	127	990	447	487	6	2,057	0.34%	0
Animal Protection	PDA	122	646	575	70	2	1,415	0.23%	0
Workers' Defence Movement	MDT	60	680	137	35	2	914	0.15%	0
Valid votes		70,033	336,487	153,342	46,076	1,311	607,249	100.00%	15
Rejected votes		5,476	16,995	15,019	3,288	160	40,938	6.32%	
Total polled		75,509	353,482	168,361	49,364	1,471	648,187	89.55%	
Registered electors		85,025	398,392	185,809	52,962	1,671	723,859		
Turnout		88.81%	88.73%	90.61%	93.21%	88.03%	89.55%		

The following candidates were elected: Daniel Bacquelaine (MR), 15,835 votes; Pierrette Cahay-André (MR), 7,418 votes; Jacques Chabot (PS), 11,668 votes; Michel Daerden (PS), 55,565 votes; Robert Denis (MR), 10,865 votes; André Frédéric (PS), 12,780 votes; Muriel Gerkens (Ecolo), 6,865 votes; José Happart (PS), 28,057 votes; Marie-Claire Lambert (PS), 11,446 votes; Sabine Laruelle (MR), 10,929 votes; Anne-Marie Lizin (PS), 29,327 votes; Philippe Monfils (MR), 15,788 votes; Didier Reynders (MR), 96,854 votes; Louis Smal (CDH), 16,881 votes; and Melchior Wathelet Jr. (CDH), 24,154 votes.

Substitutions:

- Anne-Marie Lizin (PS) was elected to the Senate and was substituted by Alain Mathot (PS) on 23 May 2003.
- José Happart (PS) resigned on 2 June 2003 and was substituted by Thierry Giet (PS).
- Michel Daerden (PS) was appointed to the Government of Wallonia and was substituted by Danielle Van Lombeek-Jacobs (PS) from 26 June 2003.
- Didier Reynders (MR was appointed to the federal government and was substituted by Pierre-Yves Jeholet between 14 July 2003 and 29 June 2004; and by Luc Gustin (MR) from 1 July 2004.
- Louis Smal (CDH) resigned on 24 June 2004 and was substituted by Benoît Drèze (CDH) on 1 July 2004.
- Sabine Laruelle (MR) was appointed to the federal government and was substituted by Josée Lejeune (MR) on 14 July 2003.
