= Federal Government of Belgium =

- Federale regering (Dutch); Gouvernement fédéral (French); Föderalregierung (German)
- Federal government
- Coat of arms of Belgium; Logo used by the government

Overview
- Established: July 1993
- State: Kingdom of Belgium
- Leader: Prime Minister
- Appointed by: King of the Belgians
- Main organ: Cabinet of Belgium
- Ministries: 15
- Responsible to: Belgian Federal Parliament
- Headquarters: Rue de la Loi/Wetstraat 16, Brussels
- Website: federal-government.be/en/

The Federal Government of Belgium (Dutch: Federale regering [feːdəˈraːlə rəˈɣeːrɪŋ]; French: Gouvernement fédéral [ɡuvɛʁnəmɑ̃ fedeʁal]; German: Föderalregierung [fødeˈʁaːlʁeˌɡiːʁʊŋ]) exercises executive power in the Kingdom of Belgium. It consists of ministers and secretaries of state ("junior", or deputy-ministers who do not sit in the Council of Ministers) drawn from the political parties which form the governing coalition. The federal government is led by the prime minister of Belgium, and ministers lead ministries of the government. Ministers together form the Council of Ministers, which is the supreme executive organ of the government (equivalent to a cabinet).

Formally, executive power is vested in the king, who formally appoints the ministers. However, under the Constitution of Belgium, the king is not politically responsible for exercising his powers, but must exercise it through the ministers. The king's acts are not valid unless countersigned by a minister, and the countersigning minister assumes political responsibility for the act. Thus, in practice, the ministers do the actual day-to-day work of governing.

== Function and composition ==
At the federal level, executive power is wielded by the federal government, headed by the prime minister. Each minister heads a ministry, and secretaries of state, who are deputy to a minister, help run these ministries. The government reflects the weight of political parties that constitute the current governing coalition for the Chamber. No single party or party family across linguistic lines holds an absolute majority of seats in Parliament. Under current practice, no party family can win enough seats to govern alone, let alone win a majority.

The number of ministers is limited to 15, equally divided between French-speaking and Dutch-speaking ministers, according to Article 99 of the Constitution. Although the prime minister is officially exempt from this quota, no francophones held the post from 1979 to 2011. Government meetings are conducted through simultaneous interpreters. Some of the ministers are also deputy prime ministers; but in addition to taking the position of acting prime minister, they are also the link between the government and their political parties. A deputy prime minister is the voice of their political party within the federal government, and is also the voice of the federal government within their political party.

The prime minister and his ministers administer the government and the various Federal Public Services (Dutch: Federale Overheidsdienst, French: Service public fédéral); roughly equivalent to ministries in other countries' administrative organization. As in the United Kingdom, ministers must defend their policies and performance in person before the Chamber.

An important de facto body is the "inner cabinet" (kernkabinet; conseil des ministres restreint or kern), consisting of the prime minister and the deputy prime ministers. They meet to make the most important political decisions.

== Formation ==
After the elections, the prime minister of the former government offers his resignation to the king, and the formation process for a new government starts. The incumbent government remains in office in a caretaker role until the new government is sworn in. This process is based largely on constitutional convention rather than written law. The king is first consulted by the President of the Chamber of Representatives and the President of the Senate. The King also meets a number of prominent politicians in order to discuss the election results. Following these meetings, an Informateur is appointed.

The Informateur has the task of exploring the various possibilities for the new Federal Government and assessing which parties can form a majority in the Federal Parliament. He also meets with prominent people in the socio-economic field to learn their views on the policy that the new Federal Government should conduct. The Informateur then reports to the King and advises him about the appointment of the Formateur. However the King can also appoint a second Informateur or appoint a royal mediator. The task of a royal mediator is to reach an agreement on contentious issues, resolve remaining obstacles to the formation of a Federal Government and prepare the ground for a Formateur. On 5 July 2007 King Albert II appointed Jean-Luc Dehaene as royal mediator to reach an agreement on a new State Reform.

The Formateur is appointed by the king on the basis of the informateur's report. The task of the Formateur is to form a new government coalition and lead the negotiations about the government agreement and the composition of the government. If these negotiations succeed, the Formateur presents a new Federal Government to the king. Usually, the Formateur also becomes the Prime Minister.

In accordance with article 96 of the Belgian Constitution, the king appoints and dismisses his ministers. However, since all royal acts require the countersignature of a minister, the outgoing prime minister countersigns the royal order appointing the new prime minister, who then countersigns the royal order accepting the resignation of his predecessor. The prime minister then countersigns the royal orders appointing the other members of the new Federal Government.

The appointed ministers take the oath of office before the king. After they have taken the oath, the new Council of Ministers meets to draw up the declaration of government, in which the Federal Government sets out the main lines of the government agreement and outlines the government agenda. The prime minister reads the declaration of government to the Chamber of Representatives, which then holds a debate on the declaration of government. Following this debate, a vote of Confidence takes place. If the prime minister obtains the confidence of the majority, he can begin implementing the government agreement.

== Recent political developments ==
Following the 2024 Belgian federal election, government formation talks began on 10 June. King Philippe named Bart De Wever (N-VA) as informateur. Incumbent Prime Minister Alexander De Croo would announce his resignation, although his government would continue to oversee their duties until a new coalition could be formed.

According to De Wever, the so-called "Arizona coalition (nl)" (N-VA - MR - LE - Vooruit - CD&V) seemed to be the only logical option for creating a new government. He was promoted by the king to preformateur- and later formateur on 26 June and 10 July respectively.

De Wever resigned as formateur on 22 August after failing to meet the deadline. King Philippe would assign Maxime Prévot (LE) as the mediator in the second round of negotiations. On the first of September, Bart De Wever resumed his role as formateur.

On 31 October, a breakthrough was almost reached after De Wever revised his initial proposals. Four out of the five parties were prepared to continue deeper negotiations, but Vooruit believed the proposals were still too unbalanced. De Wever attempted to resign as formateur for a second time on 4 November. However, King Philippe kept the resignation under consideration and asked him to continue talks with the other parties.

On 31 January 2025, a coalition agreement was reached between the negotiating parties. Bart De Wever has since replaced Alexander De Croo as Premier of Belgium.

== Incumbent government ==
The current De Wever Government, a five-party cabinet since February 2025, consists of 15 Ministers in a coalition of the Flemish N-VA, Vooruit, CD&V, and the Walloon/Francophone Mouvement Réformateur, Les Engagés.

| Portfolio | Minister | | Took Office | Left Office | Party |
| Portfolio | Image | Name | Took Office | Left Office | Party |
Prime Minister
| Prime minister of Belgium | | Bart De Wever | 3 February 2025 | Incumbent | N-VA |
Deputy Prime Ministers
| Deputy Prime Minister & Minister of Finance, Pensions, National Lottery and Federal Culture Institutions | | Jan Jambon | 3 February 2025 | Incumbent | N-VA |
| Deputy Prime Minister & Minister of Labour, Economy and Agriculture | | David Clarinval | 3 February 2025 | Incumbent | MR |
| Deputy Prime Minister & Minister of Foreign Affairs, European Affairs and Development Cooperation | | Maxime Prévot | 3 February 2025 | Incumbent | LE |
| Deputy Prime Minister & Minister of Health and Social Affairs | | Frank Vandenbroucke | 1 October 2020 | Incumbent | Vooruit |
| Deputy Prime Minister & Minister of Budget and Administrative Simplification | | Vincent Van Peteghem | 3 February 2025 | Incumbent | CD&V |
Ministers
| Minister of Defence and Foreign Trade | | Theo Francken | 3 February 2025 | Incumbent | N-VA |
| Minister of Asylum, Migration, Integration and Urban policy | | Anneleen Van Bossuyt | 3 February 2025 | Incumbent | N-VA |
| Minister of the Interior and in charge of Beliris | | Bernard Quintin | 3 February 2025 | Incumbent | MR |
| Minister of the Middle Class, Self-Employed and SMEs | | Eléonore Simonet | 3 February 2025 | Incumbent | MR |
| Minister of Energy | | Mathieu Bihet | 3 February 2025 | Incumbent | MR |
| Minister of Mobility, Climate and Ecological Transition | | Jean-Luc Crucke | 3 February 2025 | Incumbent | LE |
| Minister of Public Modernisation, Civil Service, Public Enterprises, Digitisation and Buildings Administration | | Vanessa Matz | 3 February 2025 | Incumbent | LE |
| Minister of Consumer Affairs, Social Fraud, and Equal Opportunities | | Rob Beenders | 3 February 2025 | Incumbent | Vooruit |
| Minister of Justice and the North Sea | | Annelies Verlinden | 3 February 2025 | Incumbent | CD&V |

== See also ==
- Belgian federal parliament
- Belgian order of precedence
- Consultative Committee (Belgium)
- List of governments in Belgium
