= Council of Ministers (Belgium) =

Belgian federal executive organ

Council of Ministers of The Kingdom of the Belgium
- Ministerraad (Dutch); Conseil des ministres (French); Ministerrat (German)
- State Coat of Arms of Belgium

Cabinet overview
- Formed: 1918 (108 years ago)
- Jurisdiction: Federal Government of Belgium
- Cabinet executive: Prime Minister of Belgium
- Website: Official website

The Council of Ministers (Dutch: Ministerraad; French: Conseil des ministres; German: Ministerrat) is the supreme executive organ of the Federal Government of the Kingdom of Belgium. It is a cabinet composed of the Prime Minister, who leads it, and up to fourteen senior ministers. Federal secretaries of state (junior ministers) are members of the government, but not part of the Council. The King of the Belgians historically presided over the Council, but this has not happened since 1957. The Council of Ministers formally became a permanent policy structure with the constitutional revision of 1970.

== List Council of Belgium ==
The De Wever Government is the incumbent Federal Government of Belgium, led by Prime Minister Bart De Wever since 3 February 2025.

Portfolio	Minister		Took Office	Left Office	Party
Portfolio	Image	Name	Took Office	Left Office	Party
Prime Minister
Prime minister of Belgium		Bart De Wever	3 February 2025	Incumbent	N-VA
Deputy Prime Ministers
Deputy Prime Minister & Minister of Finance, Pensions, National Lottery and Federal Culture Institutions		Jan Jambon	3 February 2025	Incumbent	N-VA
Deputy Prime Minister & Minister of Labour, Economy and Agriculture		David Clarinval	3 February 2025	Incumbent	MR
Deputy Prime Minister & Minister of Foreign Affairs, European Affairs and Development Cooperation		Maxime Prévot	3 February 2025	Incumbent	LE
Deputy Prime Minister & Minister of Health and Social Affairs		Frank Vandenbroucke	1 October 2020	Incumbent	Vooruit
Deputy Prime Minister & Minister of Budget and Administrative Simplification		Vincent Van Peteghem	3 February 2025	Incumbent	CD&V
Ministers
Minister of Defence and Foreign Trade		Theo Francken	3 February 2025	Incumbent	N-VA
Minister of Asylum, Migration, Integration and Urban policy		Anneleen Van Bossuyt	3 February 2025	Incumbent	N-VA
Minister of the Interior and in charge of Beliris		Bernard Quintin	3 February 2025	Incumbent	MR
Minister of the Middle Class, Self-Employed and SMEs		Eléonore Simonet	3 February 2025	Incumbent	MR
Minister of Energy		Mathieu Bihet	3 February 2025	Incumbent	MR
Minister of Mobility, Climate and Ecological Transition		Jean-Luc Crucke	3 February 2025	Incumbent	LE
Minister of Public Modernisation, Civil Service, Public Enterprises, Digitisation and Buildings Administration		Vanessa Matz	3 February 2025	Incumbent	LE
Minister of Consumer Affairs, Social Fraud, and Equal Opportunities		Rob Beenders	3 February 2025	Incumbent	Vooruit
Minister of Justice and the North Sea		Annelies Verlinden	3 February 2025	Incumbent	CD&V
