= Daerden =

Daerden is a surname. Notable people with the surname include:

- Frédéric Daerden (born 1970), Belgian politician and a member of the French-speaking Socialist Party
- Jos Daerden (born 1954), Belgian football manager and footballer
- Koen Daerden (born 1982), Belgian footballer
- Michel Daerden (1949–2012), Belgian politician
