= List of protected heritage sites in Herstal =

This table shows an overview of the protected heritage sites in the Walloon town Herstal. This list is part of Belgium's national heritage.

Object	Year/architect	Town/section	Address	Coordinates	Number^{?}	Image
Chapel of Saint-Lambert ^{(nl)} ^{(fr)}		Herstal		50.664872°N 5.630094°E	62051-CLT-0001-01 Info	Kapel Saint-Lambert
17th century house, now a museum ^{(nl)} ^{(fr)}		Herstal	place Licour 25	50.670699°N 5.638924°E	62051-CLT-0002-01 Info	Huis uit 17e eeuw, momenteel museum
Pepin Tower ^{(nl)} ^{(fr)}		Herstal	place Licour n° 13	50.670150°N 5.639001°E	62051-CLT-0003-01 Info	Toren Pépin
Church Notre-Dame de la Licour ^{(nl)} ^{(fr)}		Herstal		50.670380°N 5.640521°E	62051-CLT-0004-01 Info	Kerk Notre-Dame de la Licour
Breuer house ^{(nl)} ^{(fr)}		Herstal	place Coronmeuse, n°26	50.655044°N 5.610293°E	62051-CLT-0005-01 Info	
Motte (of motte-and-bailey) ^{(nl)} ^{(fr)}		Herstal		50.693840°N 5.564899°E	62051-CLT-0006-01 Info	
Church of Saint-Rémy ^{(nl)} ^{(fr)}		Herstal		50.693222°N 5.563710°E	62051-CLT-0008-01 Info	Kerk Saint-Rémy: koor, drie traveeën van middenbeuk
Presbytery: facades, roofs, chimneys and two staircases ^{(nl)} ^{(fr)}		Herstal	place Licour n° 52	50.670671°N 5.640152°E	62051-CLT-0011-01 Info	
Organs (Arnold Clerinx - 1870) Church of Saint-Lambert ^{(nl)} ^{(fr)}		Herstal		50.659377°N 5.624057°E	62051-CLT-0013-01 Info	
Ruins of old castle chapel Bouxthay ^{(nl)} ^{(fr)}		Herstal	chaussée de Brunehaut	50.669679°N 5.601374°E	62051-CLT-0014-01 Info	Ruïnes oude kapel van kasteel Bouxthay
Wandre bridge ^{(nl)} ^{(fr)}		Herstal		50.673129°N 5.644542°E	62051-CLT-0015-01 Info	
Wandre bridge ^{(nl)} ^{(fr)}		Herstal		50.673129°N 5.644542°E	62051-PEX-0001-01 Info	Brug van Wandre

== See also ==
- List of protected heritage sites in Liège (province)
