= Wathelet =

Wathelet is a surname. Notable people with the surname include:

- Jacques Wathelet (1922–2003), Belgian political activist
- Melchior Wathelet (born 1949), Belgian politician
- Melchior Wathelet, Jr. (born 1977), Belgian politician
- Grégory Wathelet (born 1980), Belgian show jumper
