= Liège (former Chamber of Representatives constituency) =

Liège was a constituency used to elect members of the Belgian Chamber of Representatives between 1831 and 2003.

== Representatives ==
Election	Rep. (Party)	Rep. (Party)	Rep. (Party)	Rep. (Party)	Rep. (Party)	Rep. (Party)	Rep. (Party)	Rep. (Party)	Rep. (Party)	Rep. (Party)	Rep. (Party)	Rep. (Party)	Rep. (Party)	Rep. (Party)
1831	Charles Marcellis (Catholic)	Jean Ghisbert de Leeuw (Catholic)	Jean Raikem (Catholic)	Louis de Laminne (Catholic)	10 seats									
1833	Antoine Ernst (Liberal)	Jérôme Keppene (Catholic)	Jean Raikem (Catholic)	Nicolas de Behr (Catholic)	10 seats									
1837	Joseph-Stanislas Fleussu (Liberal)	Noël Delfosse (Liberal)	Jean Raikem (Catholic)	Nicolas de Behr (Catholic)	10 seats									
1841	Joseph-Stanislas Fleussu (Liberal)	Noël Delfosse (Liberal)	Camille de Tornaco (Liberal)	Charles Lesoinne (Liberal)	10 seats									
1845	Pierre Destriveaux (Liberal)	Noël Delfosse (Liberal)	Camille de Tornaco (Liberal)	Charles Lesoinne (Liberal)	Walthère Frère-Orban (Liberal)	9 seats								
1848	Pierre Destriveaux (Liberal)	Noël Delfosse (Liberal)	Charles Nicolas Deliège (Liberal)	Charles Lesoinne (Liberal)	Walthère Frère-Orban (Liberal)	9 seats								
1852	Emile de Bronckart (Liberal)	Noël Delfosse (Liberal)	Charles Nicolas Deliège (Liberal)	Charles Lesoinne (Liberal)	Walthère Frère-Orban (Liberal)	9 seats								
1856	Emile de Bronckart (Liberal)	Noël Delfosse (Liberal)	Charles Nicolas Deliège (Liberal)	Charles Lesoinne (Liberal)	Walthère Frère-Orban (Liberal)	9 seats								
1857	Emile de Bronckart (Liberal)	Charles Grandgagnage (Liberal)	Clément Müller (Liberal)	Charles Lesoinne (Liberal)	Walthère Frère-Orban (Liberal)	Dieudonné Mouton (Liberal)	Frédéric Braconier (Liberal)	7 seats						
1861	Emile de Bronckart (Liberal)	Charles Grandgagnage (Liberal)	Clément Müller (Liberal)	Charles Lesoinne (Liberal)	Walthère Frère-Orban (Liberal)	Dieudonné Mouton (Liberal)	Frédéric Braconier (Liberal)	7 seats						
1864	Emile Dupont (Liberal)	Fernand de Rossius (Liberal)	Clément Müller (Liberal)	Charles Lesoinne (Liberal)	Walthère Frère-Orban (Liberal)	Dieudonné Mouton (Liberal)	Frédéric Braconier (Liberal)	Jacques Nicolas Elias (Liberal)	8 seats					
1868	Emile Dupont (Liberal)	Fernand de Rossius (Liberal)	Clément Müller (Liberal)	Charles Lesoinne (Liberal)	Walthère Frère-Orban (Liberal)	Dieudonné Mouton (Liberal)	Frédéric Braconier (Liberal)	Jacques Nicolas Elias (Liberal)	8 seats					
1870	Emile Dupont (Liberal)	Fernand de Rossius (Liberal)	Clément Müller (Liberal)	Émile Jamar (Liberal)	Walthère Frère-Orban (Liberal)	Dieudonné Mouton (Liberal)	Jean Piedboeuf (Liberal)	Julien d'Andrimont (Liberal)	8 seats					
1874	Emile Dupont (Liberal)	Fernand de Rossius (Liberal)	Julien Warnant (Liberal)	Émile Jamar (Liberal)	Walthère Frère-Orban (Liberal)	Dieudonné Mouton (Liberal)	Jean Piedboeuf (Liberal)	Xavier Neujean (Liberal)	8 seats					
1878	Emile Dupont (Liberal)	Fernand de Rossius (Liberal)	Julien Warnant (Liberal)	Émile Jamar (Liberal)	Walthère Frère-Orban (Liberal)	Dieudonné Mouton (Liberal)	Léopold Hanssens (Liberal)	Xavier Neujean (Liberal)	8 seats					
1882	Emile Dupont (Liberal)	Alfred Magis (Liberal)	Julien Warnant (Liberal)	Émile Jamar (Liberal)	Walthère Frère-Orban (Liberal)	Guillaume Fléchet (Liberal)	Léopold Hanssens (Liberal)	Xavier Neujean (Liberal)	Octave Neef-Orban (Liberal)	9 seats				
1886	Emile Dupont (Liberal)	Alfred Magis (Liberal)	Julien Warnant (Liberal)	Émile Jamar (Liberal)	Walthère Frère-Orban (Liberal)	Ferdinand Fléchet (Liberal)	Léopold Hanssens (Liberal)	Xavier Neujean (Liberal)	Octave Neef-Orban (Liberal)	9 seats				
1890	Émile Jeanne (Liberal)	Alfred Magis (Liberal)	Julien Warnant (Liberal)	Émile Jamar (Liberal)	Walthère Frère-Orban (Liberal)	Ferdinand Fléchet (Liberal)	Léopold Hanssens (Liberal)	Xavier Neujean (Liberal)	Octave Neef-Orban (Liberal)	9 seats				
1892	Charles Van Marcke de Lummen (Liberal)	Alfred Magis (Liberal)	Julien Warnant (Liberal)	Jules Halbart (Liberal)	Walthère Frère-Orban (Liberal)	Ferdinand Fléchet (Liberal)	Léopold Hanssens (Liberal)	Xavier Neujean (Liberal)	Octave Neef-Orban (Liberal)	Léon Gérard (Liberal)	Paul Van Hoegaerden (Liberal)	11 seats		
1894	Charles Van Marcke de Lummen (Liberal)	Célestin Demblon (PS)	Edward Anseele (PS)	Jean-Baptiste Schinler (PS)	Joseph Wettinck (PS)	Ferdinand Fléchet (Liberal)	Léon Brouwier (Liberal)	Xavier Neujean (Liberal)	Paul Heuse (Liberal)	Paul Smeets (PS)	Paul Van Hoegaerden (Liberal)	11 seats		
1898	Charles Van Marcke de Lummen (Liberal)	Célestin Demblon (PS)	Edward Anseele (PS)	Jean-Baptiste Schinler (PS)	Joseph Wettinck (PS)	Ferdinand Fléchet (Liberal)	Alfred Journez (Liberal)	Xavier Neujean (Liberal)	Charles Magnette (Liberal)	Paul Smeets (PS)	Paul Van Hoegaerden (Liberal)	11 seats		
1900	Charles De Ponthière (Catholic)	Célestin Demblon (PS)	Léon Troclet (PS)	Jean-Baptiste Schinler (PS)	Joseph Wettinck (PS)	Ferdinand Fléchet (Liberal)	Gustave Francotte (Catholic)	Xavier Neujean (Liberal)	Jules Dallemagne (Catholic)	Paul Smeets (PS)	Paul Trasenster (Liberal)	Samuel Donnay (PS)	12 seats	
1904	Charles De Ponthière (Catholic)	Célestin Demblon (PS)	Léon Troclet (PS)	Jean-Baptiste Schinler (PS)	Georges Polet (Catholic)	Ferdinand Fléchet (Liberal)	Gustave Francotte (Catholic)	Xavier Neujean (Liberal)	Jules Dallemagne (Catholic)	Paul Smeets (PS)	Charles Van Marcke de Lummen (Liberal)	Samuel Donnay (PS)	12 seats	
1908	Charles De Ponthière (Catholic)	Célestin Demblon (PS)	Léon Troclet (PS)	Jean-Baptiste Schinler (PS)	Georges Polet (Catholic)	Ferdinand Fléchet (Liberal)	Gustave Francotte (Catholic)	Xavier Neujean (Liberal)	Jules Dallemagne (Catholic)	Joseph Dejardin (PS)	Charles Van Marcke de Lummen (Liberal)	Samuel Donnay (PS)	12 seats	
1912	Charles De Ponthière (Catholic)	Célestin Demblon (PS)	Léon Troclet (PS)	Jean-Baptiste Schinler (PS)	Georges Polet (Catholic)	Alfred Journez (Liberal)	Nicolas Goblet (Catholic)	Xavier Neujean (Liberal)	Jules Dallemagne (Catholic)	Joseph Dejardin (PS)	Paul Van Hoegaerden (Liberal)	Samuel Donnay (PS)	Alfred François Galopin (PS)	12 seats
1919	Henri Jaspar (Catholic)	Célestin Demblon (PS)	Léon Troclet (PS)	Jean-Baptiste Schinler (PS)	Jules de Géradon (Catholic)	Julien Drèze (Liberal)	Paul Tschoffen (Catholic)	Xavier Neujean (Liberal)	Isidore Delvigne (PS)	Joseph Dejardin (PS)	Paul Van Hoegaerden (Liberal)	Samuel Donnay (PS)	Alfred François Galopin (PS)	12 seats
1921	Henri Jaspar (Catholic)	Joseph Merlot (PS)	Léon Troclet (PS)	Jean-Baptiste Schinler (PS)	Jules de Géradon (Catholic)	Emile Jennissen (Liberal)	Hubert Delacolette (Catholic)	Xavier Neujean (Liberal)	Isidore Delvigne (PS)	Joseph Dejardin (PS)	François Van Belle (PS)	Samuel Donnay (PS)	Alfred François Galopin (PS)	12 seats
1925	Henri Jaspar (Catholic)	Joseph Merlot (PS)	Léon Troclet (PS)	Jean-Baptiste Schinler (PS)	Jules de Géradon (Catholic)	Emile Jennissen (Liberal)	Hubert Delacolette (Catholic)	Xavier Neujean (Liberal)	Isidore Delvigne (PS)	Joseph Dejardin (PS)	François Van Belle (PS)	War Van Overstraeten (PCB)	Alfred François Galopin (PS)	12 seats
1929	Henri Jaspar (Catholic)	Joseph Merlot (PS)	Léon Troclet (PS)	Henri Renier (PS)	Jules de Géradon (Catholic)	Emile Jennissen (Liberal)	Hubert Delacolette (Catholic)	Xavier Neujean (Liberal)	Isidore Delvigne (PS)	Joseph Dejardin (PS)	François Van Belle (PS)	Lucie Dejardin (PS)	Alfred François Galopin (PS)	12 seats
1932	Henri Jaspar (Catholic)	Joseph Merlot (PS)	Léon Troclet (PS)	Henri Renier (PS)	Lambert Dewonck (Catholic)	Emile Jennissen (Liberal)	Hubert Delacolette (Catholic)	Désiré Horrent (Liberal)	Georges Truffaut (PS)	François Sainte (PS)	François Van Belle (PS)	Lucie Dejardin (PS)	Julien Lahaut (PCB)	12 seats
1936	Marcel Philippart de Foy (Catholic)	Joseph Merlot (PS)	Léon Troclet (PS)	Alice Degeer-Adère (PCB)	Charles Leruitte (REX)	Emile Jennissen (Liberal)	Eugène Beaufort (PCB)	François Knaepen (REX)	Georges Truffaut (PS)	François Sainte (PS)	François Van Belle (PS)	René Delbrouck (PS)	Julien Lahaut (PCB)	Ursmard Legros (REX)
1939	Marcel Philippart de Foy (Catholic)	Joseph Merlot (PS)	Léon Troclet (PS)	Alice Degeer-Adère (PCB)	Antoine Delfosse (Catholic)	Henri Heuse (Liberal)	Eugène Beaufort (PCB)	Jean Rey (Liberal)	Paul Gruselin (BSP)	François Sainte (PS)	François Van Belle (PS)	René (BSP)	Julien Lahaut (PCB)	Ursmard Legros (REX)
1946	Marcel Philippart de Foy (Catholic)	Alexandrine Fontaine-Borguet (BSP)	François Van Belle (BSP)	Ernest Burnelle (PCB)	Hubert Rassart (BSP)	Joseph Merlot (BSP)	Léon Timmermans (PCB)	Jean Rey (Liberal)	Paul Gruselin (BSP)	Paul Streel (CVP)	Pierre Harmel (CVP)	René Demoitelle (BSP)	Julien Lahaut (PCB)	Théo Dejace (PCB)
1949	Marcel Philippart de Foy (Catholic)	Alexandrine Fontaine-Borguet (BSP)	François Van Belle (BSP)	Antoine Sainte (BSP)	Antoinette Raskin-Desonnay (PCB)	Joseph Merlot (BSP)	Maurice Destenay (Liberal)	Jean Rey (Liberal)	Simon Paque (BSP)	Paul Streel (CVP)	Pierre Harmel (CVP)	René Demoitelle (BSP)	Julien Lahaut (PCB)	Théo Dejace (PCB)
1950	Marcel Philippart de Foy (Catholic)	Alexandrine Fontaine-Borguet (BSP)	François Van Belle (BSP)	Antoine Sainte (BSP)	Georges Dejardin (BSP)	Joseph Merlot (BSP)	Maurice Destenay (Liberal)	Jean Rey (Liberal)	Simon Paque (BSP)	Paul Streel (CVP)	Pierre Harmel (CVP)	René Demoitelle (BSP)	Léon Timmermans (PCB)	Théo Dejace (PCB)
1954	Marcel Philippart de Foy (Catholic)	Alexandrine Fontaine-Borguet (BSP)	François Van Belle (BSP)	Antoine Sainte (BSP)	Georges Dejardin (BSP)	Joseph Merlot (BSP)	Maurice Destenay (Liberal)	Emile-Edgard Jeunehomme (Liberal)	Simon Paque (BSP)	Paul Streel (CVP)	Pierre Harmel (CVP)	René Demoitelle (BSP)	Maurice Denis (BSP)	Théo Dejace (PCB)
1958	André Cools (BSP)	Alexandrine Fontaine-Borguet (BSP)	Auguste Olislaeger (CVP)	Antoine Sainte (BSP)	Georges Dejardin (BSP)	Joseph Merlot (BSP)	Maurice Destenay (Liberal)	Emile-Edgard Jeunehomme (Liberal)	Simon Paque (BSP)	Paul Streel (CVP)	Pierre Harmel (CVP)	Paul Herbiet (CVP)	Maurice Denis (BSP)	Théo Dejace (PCB)
1961	André Cools (BSP)	Alexandrine Fontaine-Borguet (BSP)	Auguste Olislaeger (CVP)	Antoine Sainte (BSP)	Georges Dejardin (BSP)	Joseph Merlot (BSP)	Maurice Destenay (Liberal)	Emile-Edgard Jeunehomme (Liberal)	Simon Paque (BSP)	Paul Gruselin (BSP)	Pierre Harmel (CVP)	Paul Herbiet (CVP)	Maurice Denis (BSP)	Théo Dejace (PCB)
1965	André Cools (BSP)	André Magnée (CVP)	Jules Borsu (PVV)	Antoine Sainte (BSP)	Ernest Burnelle (BCP)	Joseph Merlot (BSP)	Jean Defraigne (PVV)	Emile-Edgard Jeunehomme (Liberal)	Simon Paque (BSP)	Paul Gruselin (BSP)	Pierre Harmel (CVP)	Gérard Delruelle (PVV)	Maurice Denis (BSP)	François Perin (PWT)
1968	André Cools (BSP)	André Magnée (CVP)	Jules Borsu (PVV)	Antoine Sainte (BSP)	Edouard Close (BSP)	Joseph Merlot (BSP)	François Perin (RW)	Emile-Edgard Jeunehomme (Liberal)	Gilbert Mottard (BSP)	Marcel Levaux (PCB)	Pierre Harmel (CVP)	Gérard Delruelle (PVV)	Pierre Bertrand (RW)	François Perin (PWT)
1971	André Cools (BSP)	André Magnée (CVP)	Jules Borsu (PVV)	André Cools (PSB)	Edouard Close (BSP)	Joseph Merlot (BSP)	François Perin (RW)	Emile-Edgard Jeunehomme (Liberal)	André Magnée (cdH)	Marcel Levaux (PCB)	Jean-Pierre Grafé (cdH)	Jean Defraigne (PVV)	Pierre Bertrand (RW)	François Perin (PWT)
1974	André Cools (BSP)	André Magnée (CVP)	Charly Talbot (RW)	André Cools (PSB)	Irène Pétry (PSB)	Joseph Merlot (BSP)	François Perin (RW)	Emile-Edgard Jeunehomme (Liberal)	André Magnée (cdH)	Marcel Levaux (PCB)	Jean-Pierre Grafé (cdH)	Michel Hansenne (cdH)	Gaston Onkelinx (PS)	François Perin (PWT)
1977	André Cools (BSP)	André Magnée (CVP)	Gérard Delruelle (PRL)	André Cools (PSB)	Guy Mathot (PSB)	Jean Defraigne (PRL)	François Perin (RW)	Jean Gol (PRL)	André Magnée (cdH)	Marcel Levaux (PCB)	Jean-Pierre Grafé (cdH)	Michel Hansenne (cdH)	Gaston Onkelinx (PS)	Lucien Outers (DéFI)
1978	Alain Van der Biest (PS)	André Cools (PS)	Claude Dejardin (PS)	Edmond Rigo (PS)	Guy Mathot (PSB)	Jean Defraigne (PRL)	Gaston Onkelinx (PS)	Jean Gol (PRL)	Ghislain Hiance (cdH)	Marcel Levaux (PCB)	Jean-Pierre Grafé (cdH)	Michel Hansenne (cdH)	Henri Mordant (RW)	Ghislain Hiance (PSC)
1981	Alain Van der Biest (PS)	André Cools (PS)	Claude Dejardin (PS)	Edmond Rigo (PS)	Guy Mathot (PSB)	Jean Defraigne (PRL)	Gaston Onkelinx (PS)	Jean Gol (PRL)	Jean Mottard (PS)	José Daras (Ecolo)	Jean-Pierre Grafé (cdH)	Michel Hansenne (cdH)	Henri Mordant (RW)	Philippe Monfils (PRL)
1985	Alain Van der Biest (PS)	André Cools (PS)	Claude Dejardin (PS)	Huberte Hanquet (cdH)	Guy Mathot (PSB)	Jean Defraigne (PRL)	Gaston Onkelinx (PS)	Jean Gol (PRL)	Jean Mottard (PS)	José Daras (Ecolo)	Jean-Pierre Grafé (cdH)	Joseph Remacle Bonmariage (PRL)	Marcel Neven (PRL)	Pierre Tasset (PS)
1988	Alain Van der Biest (PS)	Charles Janssens (PS)	Jean-Marie Léonard (PS)	Laurette Onkelinx (PS)	Michel Daerden (PS)	Michel Foret (PRL)	Gaston Onkelinx (PS)	Jean Gol (PRL)	Jean Mottard (PS)	José Daras (Ecolo)	Jean-Pierre Grafé (cdH)	13 seats	Marcel Neven (PRL)	Pierre Tasset (PS)
1991	Alain Van der Biest (PS)	Charles Janssens (PS)	Jean-Marie Léonard (PS)	Laurette Onkelinx (PS)	Charles Minet (PS)	Daniel Bacquelaine (PRL)	Didier Reynders (PRL)	Jean Gol (PRL)	Jean Namotte (PS)	Thierry Detienne (Ecolo)	Jean-Pierre Grafé (cdH)	12 seats	Jean Thiel (Ecolo)	12 seats
1995	Alain Van der Biest (PS)	Charles Janssens (PS)	Luc Toussaint (PS)	Michel Dighneef (PS)	Pierrette Cahay-André (cdH)	Daniel Bacquelaine (PRL)	Didier Reynders (PRL)	Jean Gol (PRL)	Roger Lespagnard (cdH)	Thierry Detienne (Ecolo)	Jean-Pierre Grafé (cdH)	12 seats	Thierry Giet (PS)	12 seats
