= Joëlle Milquet =

Belgian politician

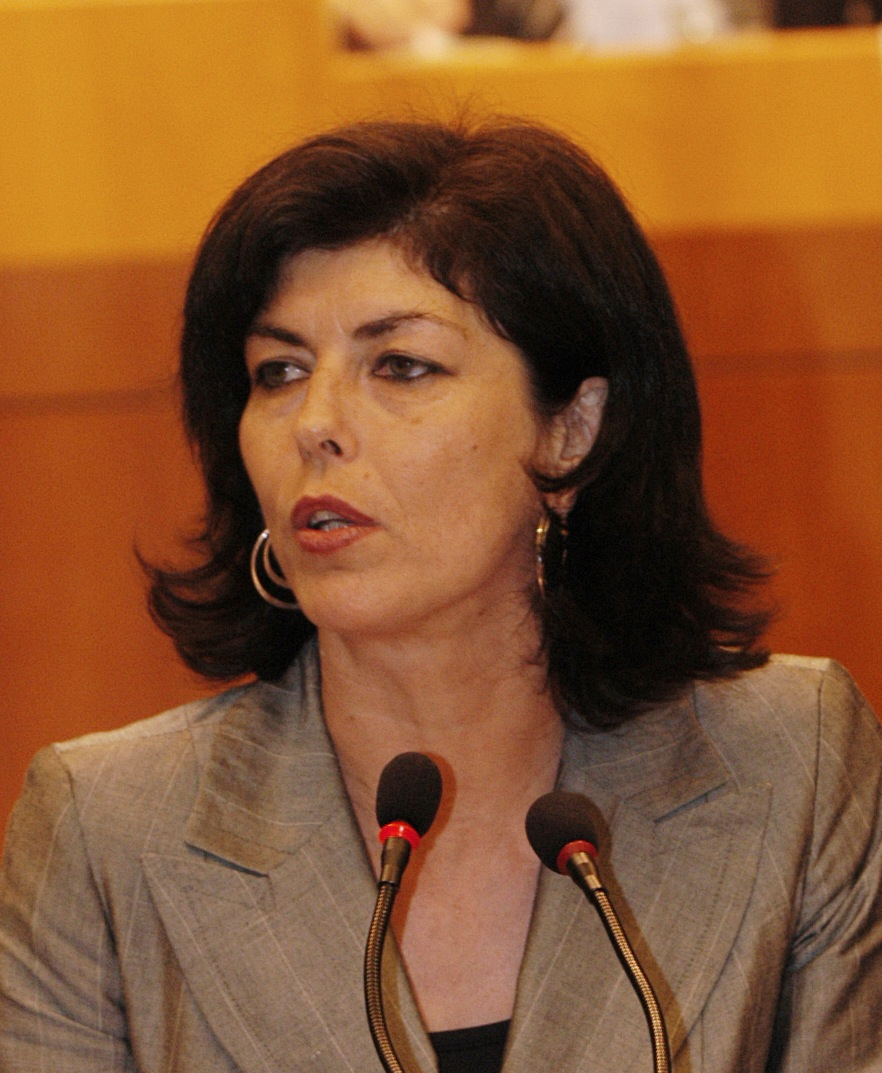

Minister of the Interior
- In office 6 December 2011 – 22 July 2014
- Prime Minister: Elio Di Rupo
- Preceded by: Annemie Turtelboom
- Succeeded by: Melchior Wathelet

Personal details
- Born: 17 February 1961 (age 65) Montignies-sur-Sambre, Belgium
- Party: Humanist Democratic Centre
- Education: Catholic University of Louvain; University of Amsterdam

Joëlle F.G.M. Milquet (French: [ʒɔ.ɛl milkɛ] ; born 17 February 1961) is a Belgian politician from the Humanist Democratic Centre (CDH).

== Education ==
She studied classics at the Institute of the Sisters of Saint Andrew in Charleroi, before going on to graduate in law from the Université Catholique de Louvain in 1984. In 1985, she took a post-graduate diploma in European law at the Universiteit van Amsterdam (UvA).

== Career ==
Joëlle started her career at the Bar in Brussels. From 1995 to 1999 she was a delegate to the Belgian Senate. She has been the president of the CDH party since and played a prominent role in the 2007-2008 formation negotiations for the Leterme I Government. During the government formation negotiations she was given the nickname "Madame Non" (Mrs. No) by the Flemish media for her fierce resistance to constitutional reform that would give more autonomy to the different communities of Belgium.

She was Deputy Prime Minister and Minister for Employment and Equal Opportunities in the Leterme I Government, which took office on 20 March 2008.

When the Leterme I government failed, Joëlle Milquet retained her seat on the Van Rompuy I Government, then on the Leterme II Government.

She was the Deputy Prime Minister, Minister of the Interior and for Equalities in the Di Rupo Government (2011-2014). In June 2014 she became minister of Lower education, Culture in the Government of the French Community.

Ms. Milquet was Vice Minister-President and Minister for Education and Culture in the Government of the French Community until 2016. She currently serves as Chair of the Security Committee of Brussels' Regional Parliament. In October 2017, Ms. Joëlle Milquet was appointed Special Adviser to President Jean-Claude Juncker for the compensation of victims of crime.

As opinion maker and several times former minister she is often interviewed by Belgian newspapers and Television such as RTBF, Le Soir and La Libre Belgique, LN24, Paris Match etc..

In January 2021, she was appointed President of the European Centre for Electoral Support's Strategic and Advisory Committee which is one of the most important organizations implementing electoral and democracy assistance projects worldwide funded by the European Union and its Member States.

In January 2025 she was appointed as Chair of the Board of Directors of RTBF (Radio-télévision belge de la communauté française), Belgium's national public broadcasting organization.

Political offices
Preceded by Annemie Turtelboom	Minister of the Interior; 2011–2014	Succeeded by Melchior Wathelet
