= Isabelle Hansez =

Belgian politician (born 1971)

Member of the Chamber of Representatives
- Incumbent
- Assumed office 10 July 2024
- Constituency: Liège

Personal details
- Born: 8 September 1971 (age 54)
- Party: Les Engagés

Isabelle Hansez (born 8 September 1971) is a Belgian academic and politician serving as a member of the Chamber of Representatives since 2024. She previously served as dean of the faculty of psychology at the University of Liège.
