= Sophie Thémont =

Belgian politician (born 1973)

Member of the Chamber of Representatives
- Incumbent
- Assumed office 20 June 2019
- Constituency: Liège

Personal details
- Born: 3 May 1973 (age 52)
- Party: Socialist Party

Sophie Thémont (born 3 May 1973) is a Belgian politician of the Socialist Party serving as a member of the Chamber of Representatives since 2019. She has served as mayor of Flémalle since 2022.
