= Nadia Moscufo =

Belgian politician (born 1963)

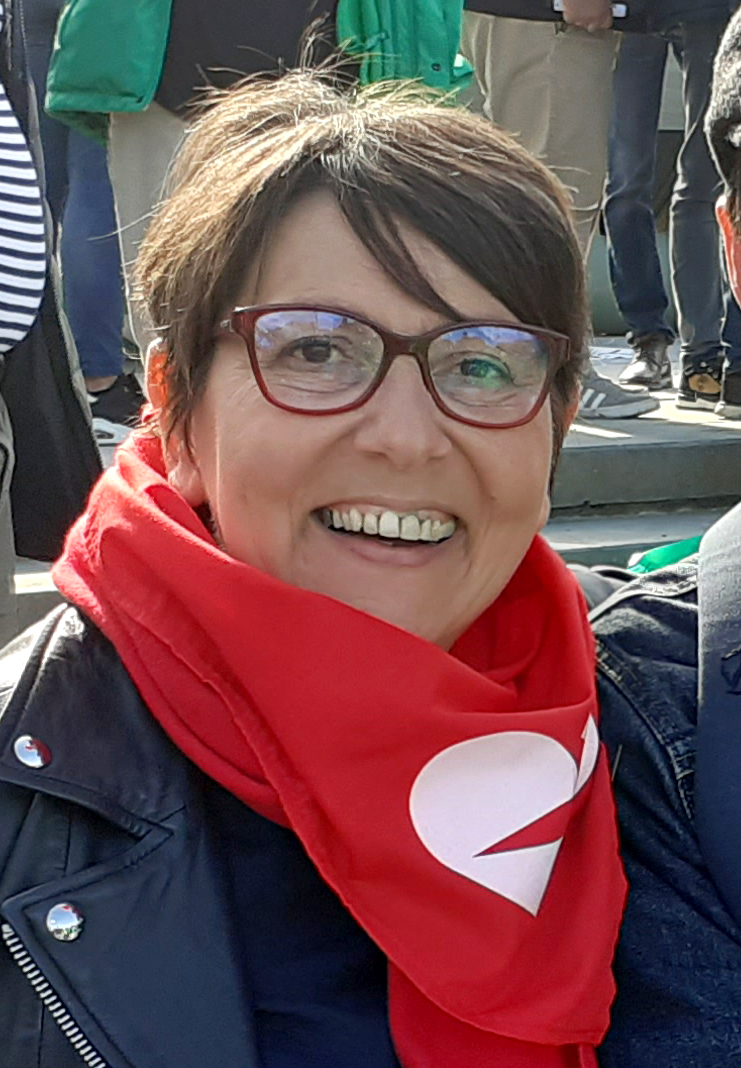
- Moscufo in September 2022

Member of the Chamber of Representatives
- Incumbent
- Assumed office 20 June 2019
- Constituency: Liège

Personal details
- Born: 16 December 1963 (age 62) Hermalle-sous-Argenteau, Belgium
- Party: Workers' Party of Belgium

Nadia Moscufo (born 16 December 1963) is a Belgian trade unionist, politician and member of the Chamber of Representatives. A member of the Workers' Party of Belgium, she has represented Liège since June 2019.

Moscufo was born on 16 December 1963 in Hermalle-sous-Argenteau. Her parents were from Castelmauro in Southern Italy and had been members of the Italian Communist Party (PCI). She has two sisters and grew up in Herstal where she was educated at the local Atheneum. She had an abortion when she was 16-years old. After school she had various jobs in retail from 1981 and was a trade union representative for the Centrale nationale des employés (CNE). Following her divorce, she gave up work in 1987 to look after her son but after three months she resumed working and was employed by Aldi Nord for 21 years. She was a representative for the Association of Employees, Technicians and Managers (SETCa). She left Aldi in 2008 to work at the Medics for the People (MPLP) health centre in Herstal. She was a representative for the General Labour Federation of Belgium (FGTB).

Moscufo was a member of the Communist Party of Belgium but wasn't active. She became acquainted with Workers' Party of Belgium (PTB) members after receiving treatment at the MPLP health centre in Herstal. She joined the PTB in 1986. She was elected to the municipal council in Herstal at the 2000 local election. She was reselected at 2006, 2012 and 2018 local elections.

Moscufo contested the 2003 federal election as the PTB's first placed candidate in Liège but the party failed to win any seats in the constituency. She contested the 2007 and 2010 federal elections as the PTB's second placed candidate in Liège but on each occasion the party failed to win any seats in the constituency. She contested the 2014 federal election as the PTB's second placed candidate in Liège but the party won only a single seat in the constituency. She was elected to the Chamber of Representatives at the 2019 federal election. She was re-elected at the 2024 federal election.

Moscufo has two sons.

Electoral history of Nadia Moscufo
Election	Constituency	Party	Votes	Result
2003 federal	Liège	Workers' Party of Belgium	938	Not elected
2006 local	Herstal	Workers' Party of Belgium	677	Elected
2007 federal	Liège	Workers' Party of Belgium	1,071	Not elected
2010 federal	Liège	Workers' Party of Belgium	1,877	Not elected
2012 local	Herstal	Workers' Party of Belgium	994	Elected
2014 federal	Liège	Workers' Party of Belgium	4,656	Not elected
2018 local	Herstal	Workers' Party of Belgium	2,054	Elected
2019 federal	Liège	Workers' Party of Belgium	7,411	Elected
2024 federal	Liège	Workers' Party of Belgium	6,709	Elected
