= Luc Frank =

Belgian politician (born 1972)

Member of the Chamber of Representatives
- Incumbent
- Assumed office 10 July 2024
- Constituency: Liège

Personal details
- Born: 29 April 1972 (age 53)
- Party: Christlich Soziale Partei

Luc Frank (born 29 April 1972) is a Belgian politician serving as a member of the Chamber of Representatives since 2024. Until 2024, he served as mayor of Kelmis.
