= Christophe Lacroix =

Belgian politician (born 1966)

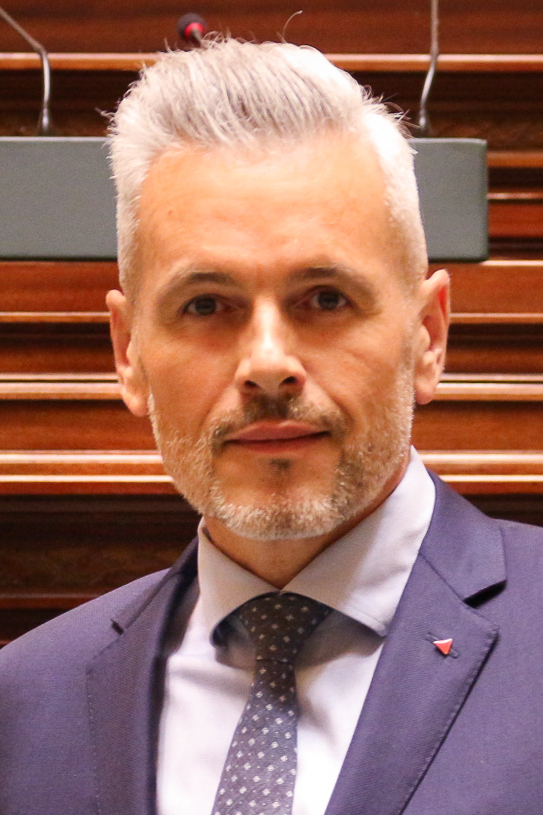
- Lacroix in 2019

Member of the Chamber of Representatives
- Incumbent
- Assumed office 20 June 2019
- Constituency: Liège
- In office 25 October 2012 – 18 June 2014
- Preceded by: Guy Coëme
- Constituency: Liège

Personal details
- Born: 22 December 1966 (age 59)
- Party: Socialist Party

Christophe Lacroix (born 22 December 1966) is a Belgian politician of the Socialist Party. He has been a member of the Chamber of Representatives since 2019, having previously served from 2012 to 2014. He was a member of the Senate in 2014, and a minister in the Government of Wallonia from 2014 to 2017.
