= Catherine Delcourt =

Belgian politician (born 1974)

Member of the Chamber of Representatives
- Incumbent
- Assumed office 10 July 2024
- Constituency: Liège

Personal details
- Born: 19 November 1974 (age 51)
- Party: Reformist Movement

Catherine Delcourt (born 19 November 1974) is a Belgian politician of the Reformist Movement serving as a member of the Chamber of Representatives since 2024. From 2016 to 2024, she served as district commissioner of the Liège Province.
