= Victoria Vandeberg =

Belgian politician (born 1997)

Member of the Chamber of Representatives
- Incumbent
- Assumed office 3 February 2025
- Preceded by: Mathieu Bihet
- Constituency: Liège

Personal details
- Born: 2 July 1997 (age 28)
- Party: Reformist Movement

Victoria Vandeberg (born 2 July 1997) is a Belgian politician serving as a member of the Chamber of Representatives since 2025. She has served as mayor of Jalhay since 2024.
