= Gilles Foret =

Belgian politician (born 1978)

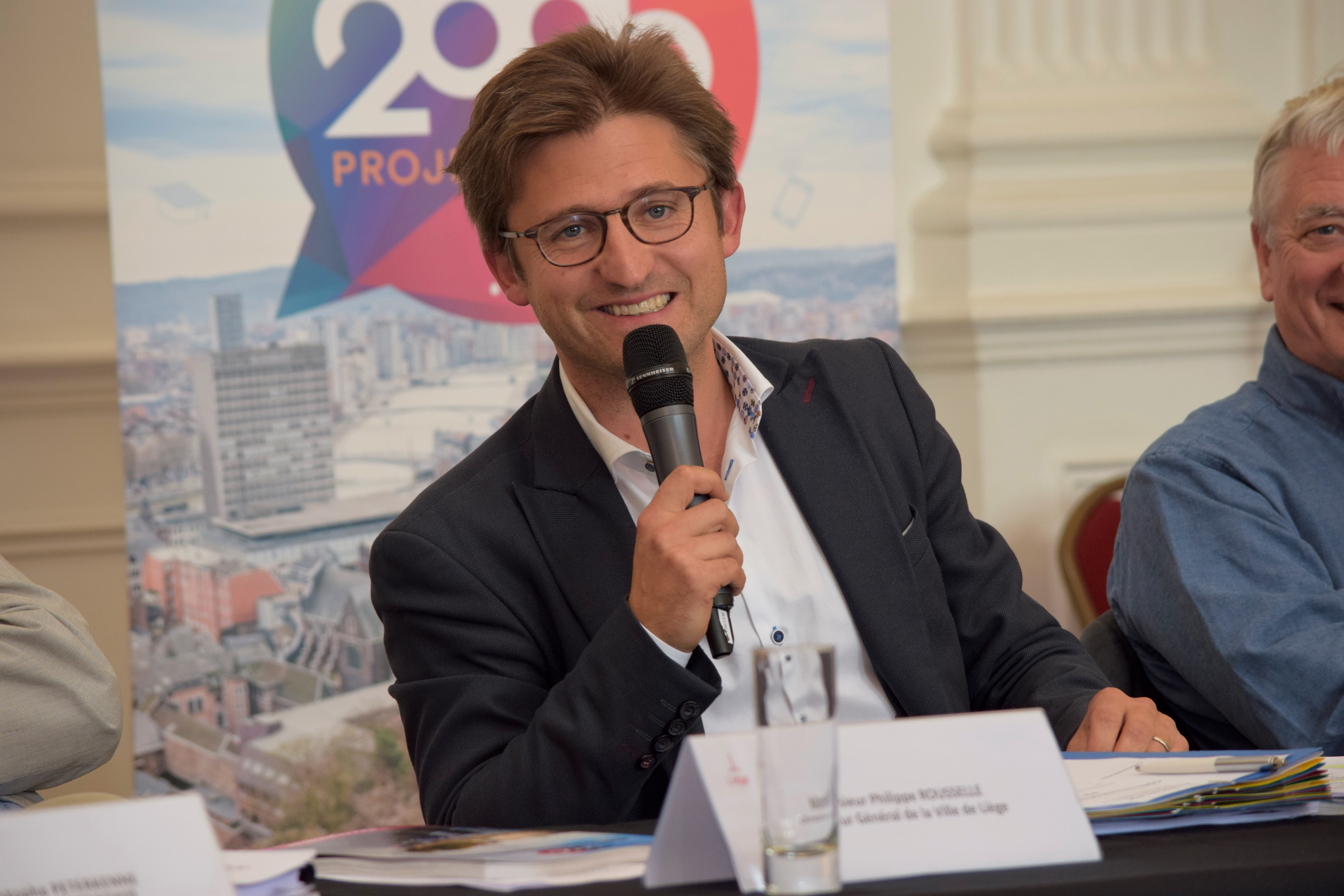
- Foret in 2019

Member of the Chamber of Representatives
- Incumbent
- Assumed office 10 July 2024
- Constituency: Liège
- In office 19 June 2014 – 20 June 2019
- Constituency: Liège

Personal details
- Born: 17 March 1978 (age 48)
- Party: Reformist Movement
- Parent: Michel Foret (father)

Gilles Foret (born 17 March 1978) is a Belgian politician of the Reformist Movement. He has been a member of the Chamber of Representatives since 2024, having previously served from 2014 to 2019. He is the son of Michel Foret.
