= Simon Dethier =

Belgian politician (born 1988)

Member of the Chamber of Representatives
- In office 3 February 2025 – 12 June 2025
- Preceded by: Vanessa Matz
- Succeeded by: Serge Hiligsmann
- Constituency: Liège

Personal details
- Born: 29 March 1988 (age 38)
- Party: Les Engagés

Simon Dethier (born 29 March 1988) is a Belgian politician serving as director general of SPW Intérieur et Action sociale since 2025. From February to June 2025, he was a member of the Chamber of Representatives.
