= Arrondissement of Liège =

Arrondissement in Wallonia, Belgium

Arrondissement of Liège Arrondissement de Liège
- Arrondissement
- Location of the arrondissement in Liège Province
- Coordinates: 50.65°N 5.55°E
- Country: Belgium
- Region: Wallonia
- Province: Liège
- Municipalities: 24

Area
  - Total: 796.87 km^{2} (307.67 sq mi)

Population (1 January 2017)
  - Total: 622,841
  - Density: 781.61/km^{2} (2,024.4/sq mi)
- Time zone: UTC+1 (CET)
  - Summer (DST): UTC+2 (CEST)

The Arrondissement of Liège (French: Arrondissement de Liège; Dutch: Arrondissement Luik) is one of the four administrative arrondissements in the Walloon province of Liège, Belgium.

It is both an administrative and a judicial arrondissement. However, the Judicial Arrondissement of Liège also comprises the municipalities of Berloz, Crisnée, Donceel, Faimes, Fexhe-le-Haut-Clocher, Geer, Oreye, Remicourt and Waremme in the Arrondissement of Waremme. The municipality of Comblain-au-Pont, even though it is a part of the Administrative Arrondissement of Liège, is not a part of the Judicial Arrondissement of Liège, but of the Judicial Arrondissement of Huy.

== Municipalities ==
The Administrative Arrondissement of Liège consists of the following municipalities:

- Ans
- Awans
- Aywaille
- Beyne-Heusay
- Bassenge
- Blegny
- Chaudfontaine
- Comblain-au-Pont
- Dalhem
- Esneux
- Flémalle
- Fléron
- Grâce-Hollogne
- Herstal
- Juprelle
- Liège
- Neupré
- Oupeye
- Saint-Nicolas
- Seraing
- Soumagne
- Sprimont
- Trooz
- Visé
