= Huy-Waremme (Chamber of Representatives constituency) =

Belgian political subdivision

Huy-Waremme was a constituency used to elect members of the Belgian Chamber of Representatives between 1900 and 2003.

== Representatives ==
Election	Representative (Party)	Representative (Party)	Representative (Party)	Representative (Party)
1900	Charles Gouters (PS)	Dominique Pitsaer (Catholic)	Georges Hubin (PS)	Jules Giroul (Liberal)
1904	Gustave de Terwangne (Catholic)	Dominique Pitsaer (Catholic)	Georges Hubin (PS)	Jules Giroul (Liberal)
1908	Joseph Wauters (PS)	Dominique Pitsaer (Catholic)	Georges Hubin (PS)	Jules Giroul (Liberal)
1912	Joseph Wauters (PS)	Pierre de Liedekerke de Pailhe (Catholic)	Georges Hubin (PS)	Pierre Guillaume Imperiali des Princes de Francavilla (Catholic)
1919	Joseph Wauters (PS)	Pierre de Liedekerke de Pailhe (Catholic)	Georges Hubin (PS)	Fernand Lebeau (PS)
1921	Joseph Wauters (PS)	Pierre de Liedekerke de Pailhe (Catholic)	Georges Hubin (PS)	Joseph Pierco (Liberal)
1925	Joseph Wauters (PS)	Pierre de Liedekerke de Pailhe (Catholic)	Georges Hubin (PS)	Joseph Pierco (Liberal)
1929	Henri De Rasquinet (PS)	Pierre de Liedekerke de Pailhe (Catholic)	Georges Hubin (PS)	Joseph Pierco (Liberal)
1932	Henri De Rasquinet (PS)	Pierre de Liedekerke de Pailhe (Catholic)	Georges Hubin (PS)	Joseph Pierco (Liberal)
1936	Arthur Wauters (PS)	Pierre Dijon (Catholic)	Georges Hubin (PS)	Joseph Pierco (Liberal)
1939	Hubert Lapaille (PS)	Pierre Dijon (Catholic)	Georges Hubin (PS)	Joseph Pierco (Liberal)
1946	Edmond Leburton (BSP)	Georges Loumaye (Liberal)	Georges Housiaux (BSP)	3 seats
1949	Edmond Leburton (BSP)	Georges Loumaye (Liberal)	Georges Housiaux (BSP)	3 seats
1950	Edmond Leburton (BSP)	Antoine Goffin (CVP)	Georges Housiaux (BSP)	3 seats
1954	Edmond Leburton (BSP)	Antoine Goffin (CVP)	Georges Housiaux (BSP)	3 seats
1958	Edmond Leburton (BSP)	Freddy Terwagne (BSP)	Georges Housiaux (BSP)	3 seats
1961	Edmond Leburton (BSP)	Freddy Terwagne (BSP)	Georges Houbart (CVP)	3 seats
1965	Edmond Leburton (BSP)	Freddy Terwagne (BSP)	Lucien Gustin (PVV)	3 seats
1968	Edmond Leburton (BSP)	Fernand Hubin (BSP)	Lucien Gustin (PVV)	3 seats
1971	Edmond Leburton (BSP)	Fernand Hubin (BSP)	Eugène Charpentier (cdH)	Robert Collignon (PSB)
1974	Edmond Leburton (BSP)	Fernand Hubin (BSP)	Eugène Charpentier (cdH)	Joseph Fiévez (RW)
1977	Edmond Leburton (BSP)	Fernand Hubin (BSP)	Eugène Charpentier (cdH)	Frédéric François (cdH)
1978	Edmond Leburton (BSP)	Joseph Fiévez (RW)	Eugène Charpentier (cdH)	Frédéric François (cdH)
1981	Guy Coëme (PS)	Daniel Fedrigo (PCB)	Eugène Charpentier (cdH)	Robert Collignon (PS)
1985	Guy Coëme (PS)	Alfred Léonard (cdH)	Eugène Charpentier (cdH)	Victor Albert (PS)
1988	Guy Coëme (PS)	Alfred Léonard (cdH)	Eugène Charpentier (cdH)	Pierre Hazette (PRL)
1991	Guy Coëme (PS)	Anne-Marie Lizin (PS)	Eugène Charpentier (cdH)	Pierre Hazette (PRL)
1995	Robert Meureau (PS)	Martine Schüttringer (Ecolo)	Eugène Charpentier (cdH)	3 seats
1999	Jacques Chabot (PS)	2 seats	Luc Paque (cdH)	2 seats
