= De Wever government =

Incumbent Belgian government

De Wever Government
- 99th Cabinet of Belgium

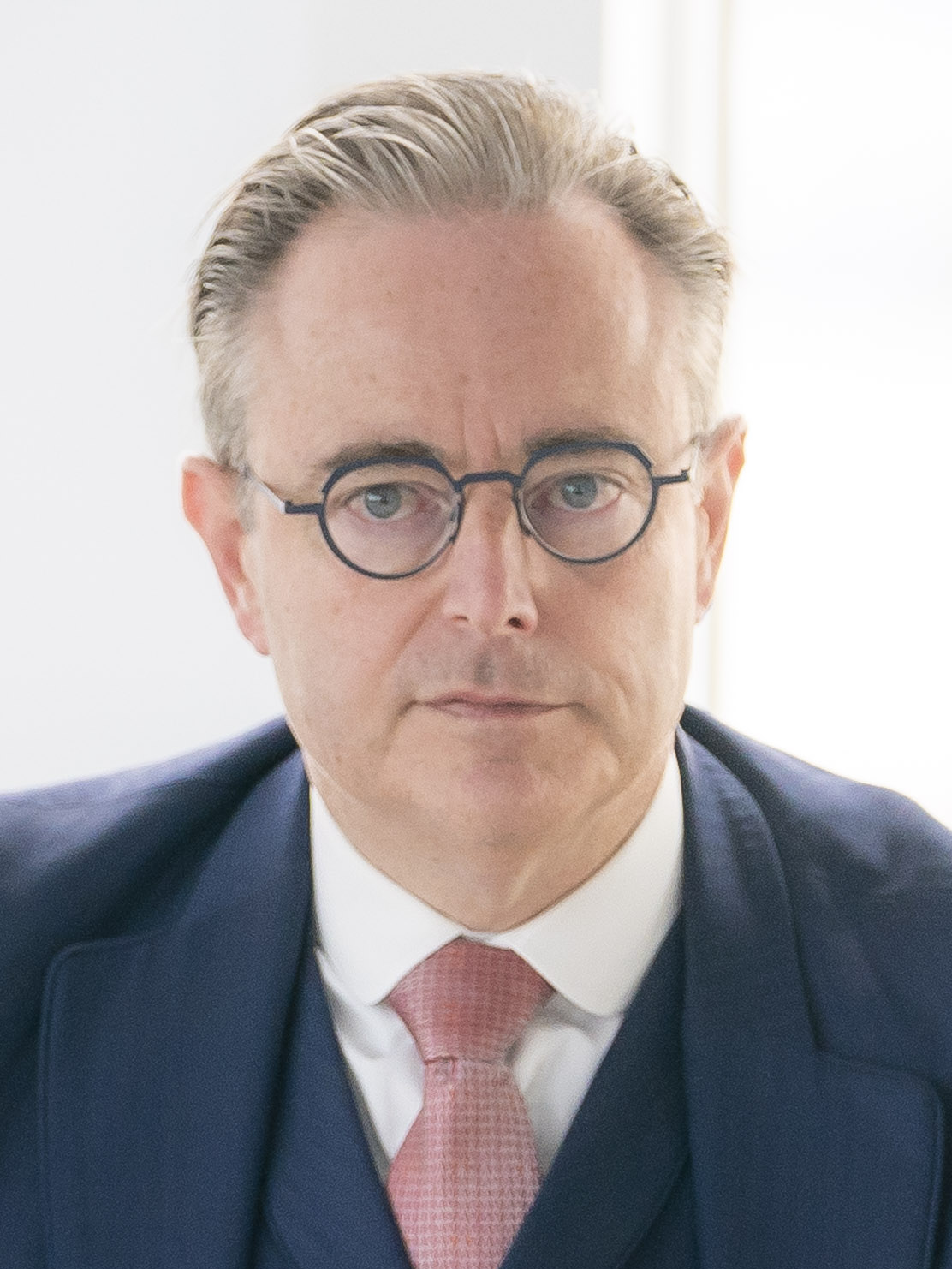
- Date formed: 3 February 2025

People and organisations
- Head of state: Philippe of Belgium
- Head of government: Bart De Wever
- No. of ministers: 15
- Member parties: N-VA (Flemish); MR (Francophone); LE (Francophone); Forward (Flemish); CD&V (Flemish)
- Status in legislature: Arizona coalition (majority)
- Opposition parties: Vlaams Belang (Flemish); PS (Francophone); PVDA-PTB (multilingual); Open Vld (Flemish); Groen (Flemish); Ecolo (Francophone); DéFI (Francophone)

History
- Incoming formation: 2024–2025 formation
- Election: 2024 Belgian federal election
- Legislature term: 2024–2029
- Predecessor: De Croo

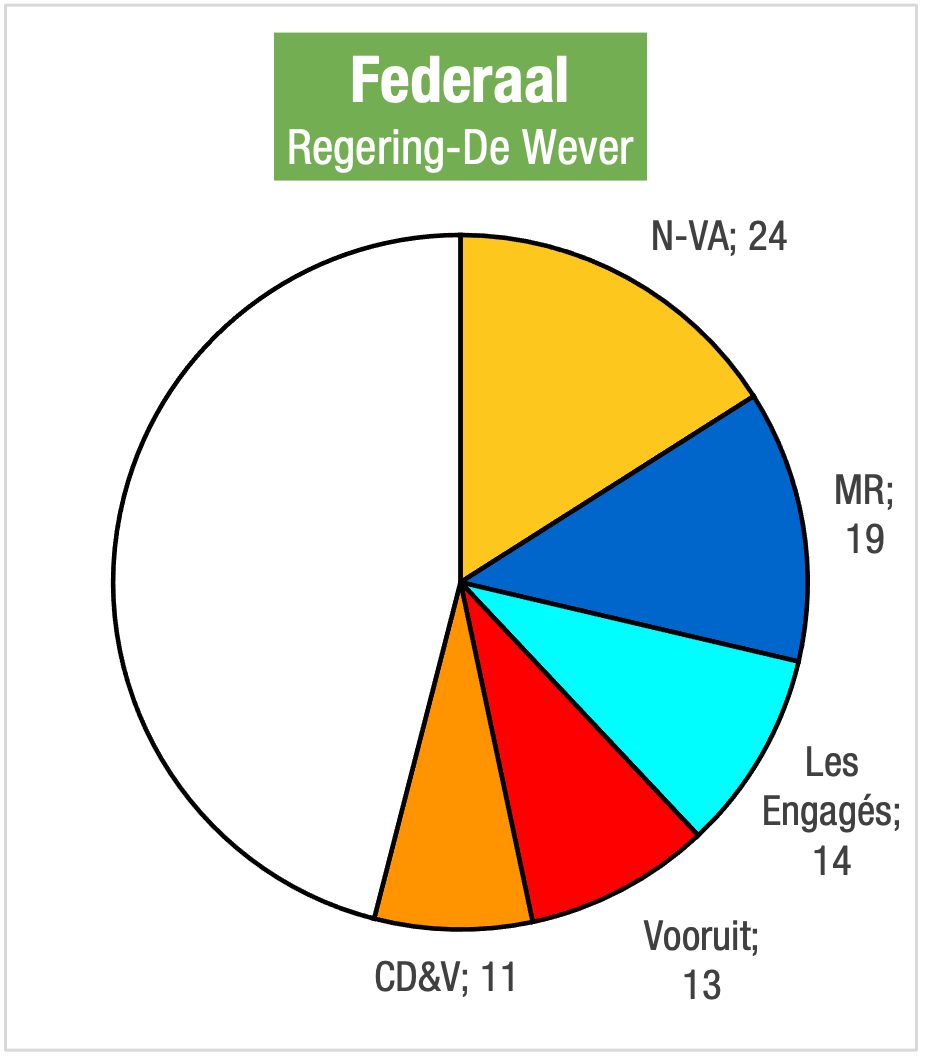
Distribution of seats in the Chamber of Representatives.

The De Wever government is the incumbent federal government of Belgium after the 2024 Belgian federal election. On 31 January 2025, a final agreement was reached between N-VA, CD&V, Vooruit, MR and Les Engagés to form a so-called "Arizona coalition", named after the colours of the Arizona state flag. The new government is led by Bart De Wever, who is the first Flemish nationalist Prime Minister of Belgium. The ministers were sworn in before King Philippe on the third of February.

== Composition ==
| Portfolio | Minister | | Took Office | Left Office | Party |
| Portfolio | Image | Name | Took Office | Left Office | Party |
Prime Minister
| Prime minister of Belgium | | Bart De Wever | 3 February 2025 | Incumbent | N-VA |
Deputy Prime Ministers
| Deputy Prime Minister & Minister of Finance, Pensions, National Lottery and Federal Culture Institutions | | Jan Jambon | 3 February 2025 | Incumbent | N-VA |
| Deputy Prime Minister & Minister of Labour, Economy and Agriculture | | David Clarinval | 3 February 2025 | Incumbent | MR |
| Deputy Prime Minister & Minister of Foreign Affairs, European Affairs and Development Cooperation | | Maxime Prévot | 3 February 2025 | Incumbent | LE |
| Deputy Prime Minister & Minister of Health and Social Affairs | | Frank Vandenbroucke | 1 October 2020 | Incumbent | Vooruit |
| Deputy Prime Minister & Minister of Budget and Administrative Simplification | | Vincent Van Peteghem | 3 February 2025 | Incumbent | CD&V |
Ministers
| Minister of Defence and Foreign Trade | | Theo Francken | 3 February 2025 | Incumbent | N-VA |
| Minister of Asylum, Migration, Integration and Urban policy | | Anneleen Van Bossuyt | 3 February 2025 | Incumbent | N-VA |
| Minister of the Interior and in charge of Beliris | | Bernard Quintin | 3 February 2025 | Incumbent | MR |
| Minister of the Middle Class, Self-Employed and SMEs | | Eléonore Simonet | 3 February 2025 | Incumbent | MR |
| Minister of Energy | | Mathieu Bihet | 3 February 2025 | Incumbent | MR |
| Minister of Mobility, Climate and Ecological Transition | | Jean-Luc Crucke | 3 February 2025 | Incumbent | LE |
| Minister of Public Modernisation, Civil Service, Public Enterprises, Digitisation and Buildings Administration | | Vanessa Matz | 3 February 2025 | Incumbent | LE |
| Minister of Consumer Affairs, Social Fraud, and Equal Opportunities | | Rob Beenders | 3 February 2025 | Incumbent | Vooruit |
| Minister of Justice and the North Sea | | Annelies Verlinden | 3 February 2025 | Incumbent | CD&V |

== Other functions ==
| | Portfolio | Image | Name | Party | Term |
|---|---|---|---|---|---|
| (European Union) | European commissioner Commissioner for Equality; Preparedness and Crisis Management (von der Leyen Commission II) | | Hadja Lahbib | MR | 1 December 2024 — |
| (Belgium) | President; Chamber of Representatives | | Peter De Roover | N-VA | 10 July 2024 — |
| (Belgium) | President; Senate | | Vincent Blondel | LE | 21 February 2025 — |
