= Mathieu Bihet =

Belgian politician (born 1991)

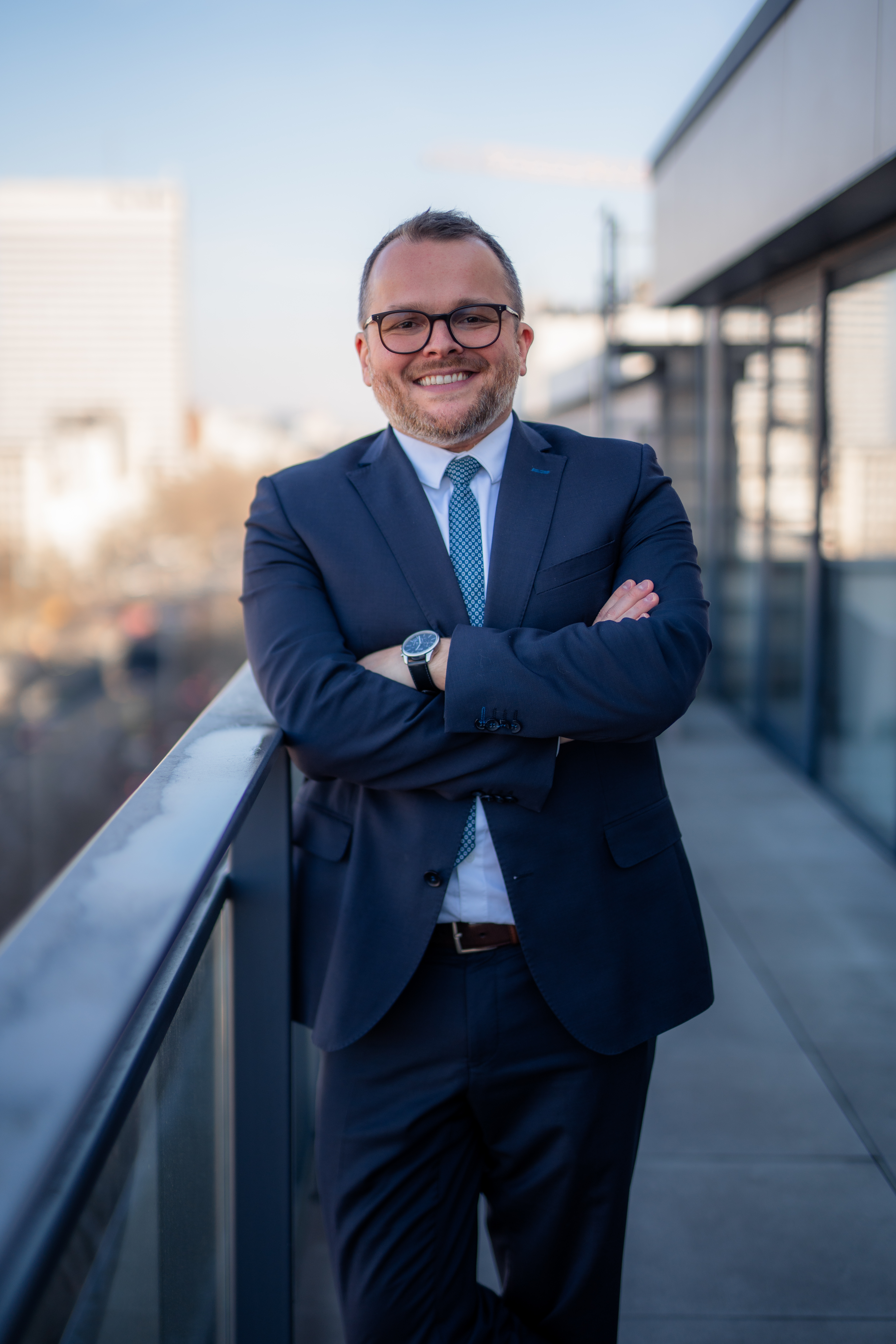
- Bihet in 2025

Minister of Energy
- Incumbent
- Assumed office 3 February 2025
- Prime Minister: Bart De Wever
- Preceded by: Tinne Van der Straeten

Member of the Chamber of Representatives
- In office 22 September 2022 – 3 February 2025
- Preceded by: Kattrin Jadin
- Succeeded by: Victoria Vandeberg
- Constituency: Liège
- In office 17 March 2020 – 1 October 2020
- Preceded by: Daniel Bacquelaine
- Succeeded by: Daniel Bacquelaine
- Constituency: Liège

Member of the Neupré City Council
- Incumbent
- Assumed office 14 October 2012

Personal details
- Born: 7 July 1991 (age 35) Liège, Belgium
- Party: Reformist Movement

Mathieu Bihet (born 7 July 1991) is a Belgian politician of the Reformist Movement who has been serving as Minister of Energy, in the De Wever Government since February 2025. He previously was a member of the Chamber of Representatives between 2022 and 2025, having previously served in 2020. From 2015 to 2019, he was the leader of Jeunes MR.
