= Michel Foret =

Belgian politician and lawyer

- Born: 19 April 1948 (age 77); Liège
- Occupations: politician, lawyer
- Children: Gilles Foret

Michel Foret (born 19 April 1948) is a Belgian politician and lawyer. A member of the Reformist Movement, he is the current governor of Liège Province since 11 February 2004.
