= Michel Daerden =

Belgian politician

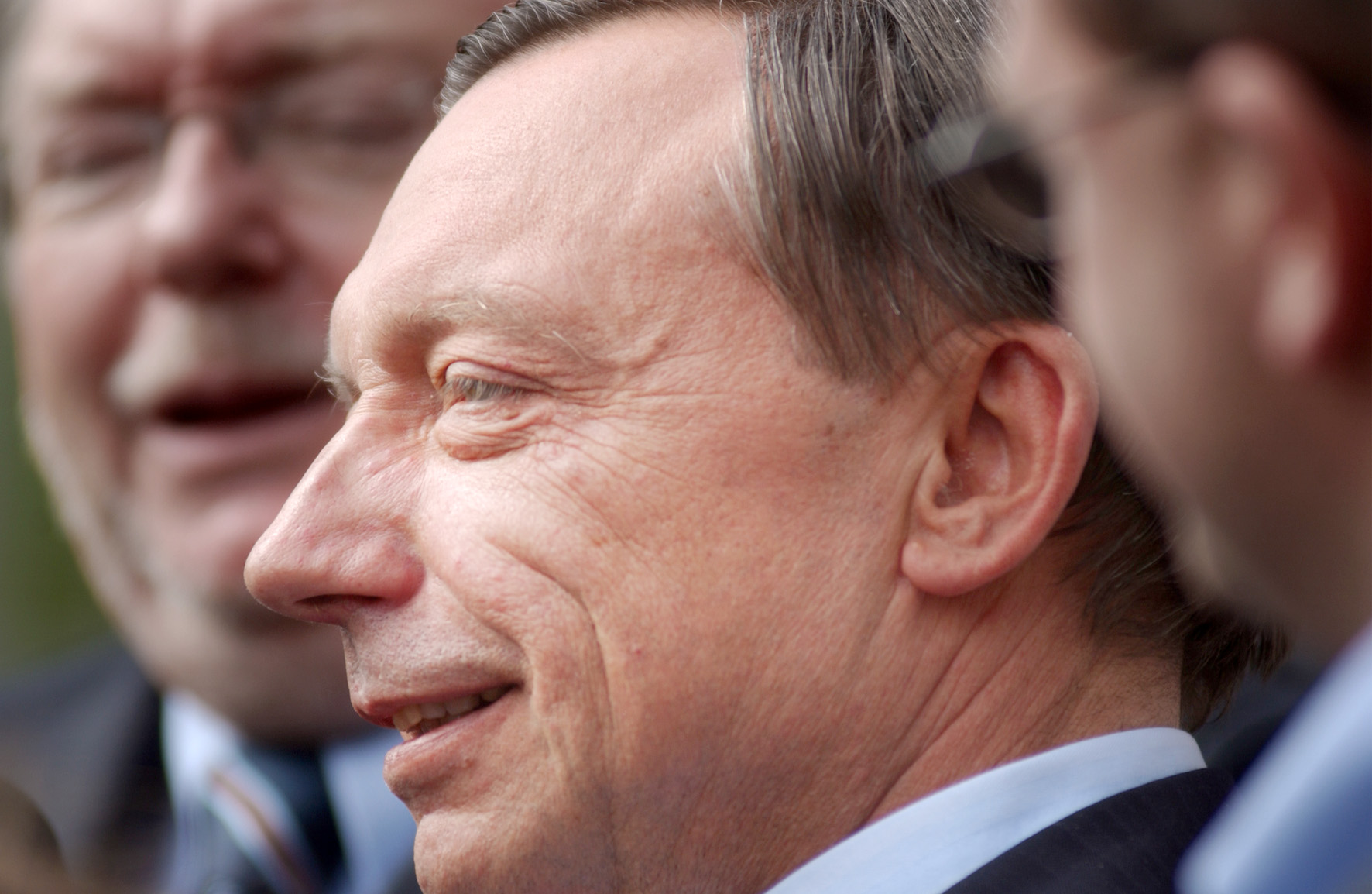
- Michel Daerden in 2005

Federal Minister for Pensions and Big Cities
- In office 25 November 2009 – 6 December 2011

Mayor of Ans
- In office 1993 – 2011

Vice-President in charge of Budget, Finance, and Public Works
- In office 2004 – 2009
- Constituency: Walloon Government

Vice-President in charge of Public Service and Sports
- In office 2007 – 2009
- Constituency: Government of the French Community

Vice-President in charge of Budget and Finance
- In office July 2004 – 2009
- Constituency: Government of the French Community

Deputy
- Constituency: Liège

Minister of Budget
- In office June 2003 – June 2004
- Constituency: Government of the French Community

Vice-President in charge of Finance, Budget, Housing, Infrastructure, and Public Works
- In office April 2000 – June 2004
- Constituency: Walloon Government

Personal details
- Born: 16 November 1949 Baudour, Belgium
- Died: 5 August 2012 (aged 62) Fréjus, France
- Party: Parti Socialiste
- Children: Frédéric Daerden (son); Aurore Daerden (daughter); Elena Daerden (daughter)
- Occupation: politician

Michel Daerden (16 November 1949 – 5 August 2012) was a francophone Belgian politician, a member of the Parti Socialiste, and a finance auditor.

Daerden was born in Baudour, Belgium. With a reputation as a 'bon vivant', his undenied penchant for a drink (especially Pomerol) led him to be nicknamed "the Gainsbourg of Belgian Politics" both by himself in a famous TV interview and by Belgium's much respected weekly news magazine Le Vif/L'Express.

== Biography ==
=== Political career ===
Michel Daerden was elected to the Belgian Chamber of Representatives in 1987. In 1991 he was elected to the Belgian Senate.

Daerden served in the Federal government as Federal Minister for Science Policy and Infrastructures (1994-1995) and Federal Minister of Transport (1995-1999). After the elections of 1999 Daerden was elected to the Walloon Parliament and became Minister for Employment, Training and Housing in the Walloon Government. Daerden then became vice-president of the Walloon Government in April 2000 and was in charge of Finance, Budget, Housing, Infrastructure and Public Works (April 2000 to June 2004), he concurrently served as minister of the budget for the French Community (June 2003 to June 2004). After the Regional elections of June 2004 he became vice-president of the Walloon Government in charge of Budget, Finance and Equipment(2004-2009) and co-currently vice-president of the Government of the French Community in charge of Budget and Finance (2004-2009). In 2009 Daerden transferred to the federal government where he served as Minister for Pensions and Large Cities (2009-2011).

Daerden also served as mayor of Ans, on the outskirts of Liège from 1993 to 2011. In March 2011 a majority of the town council, including members of his own party, voted to depose Daerden as mayor. The Liège division of the PS later supported this resolution and forced Daerden to relinquish his office.

=== Personal life ===
Michel Daerden had three children. His son, Frédéric Daerden, is the mayor of Herstal and an MEP.

On 26 July 2012, while on holiday in France, Daerden suffered a heart attack which put him in a coma. He died, aged 62, on 5 August in Fréjus.

== Star on Youtube ==
Michel Daerden was the subject of special attention after the Belgian municipal elections of 2006. Excerpts of his post-election interview on RTBF and on local television RTC-Télé Liège, where he appears intoxicated, were circulated widely on YouTube. A week later, Daerden was asked on the TV show Mise au Point whether he had had too much to drink at that time. His humorous response was "Pas plus que d'habitude" ("No more than usual").

== Diplomas ==
- Master's degree in trade and finance, Hautes Études Commerciales de Liège, 1971, with distinction.
- Aggregation of secondary education for commercial sciences, HEC Management School – University of Liege, 1973, with great distinction.
- Science Degree in Applied Economics (orientation: business administration, option business administration), University of Mons, 1975.
- Master's degree as Auditor, University of Mons-Hainaut, 1977, with great distinction.
