= Herstal =

City in Liège Province, Wallonia, Belgium

Herstal Hesta (Walloon)
- City and municipality
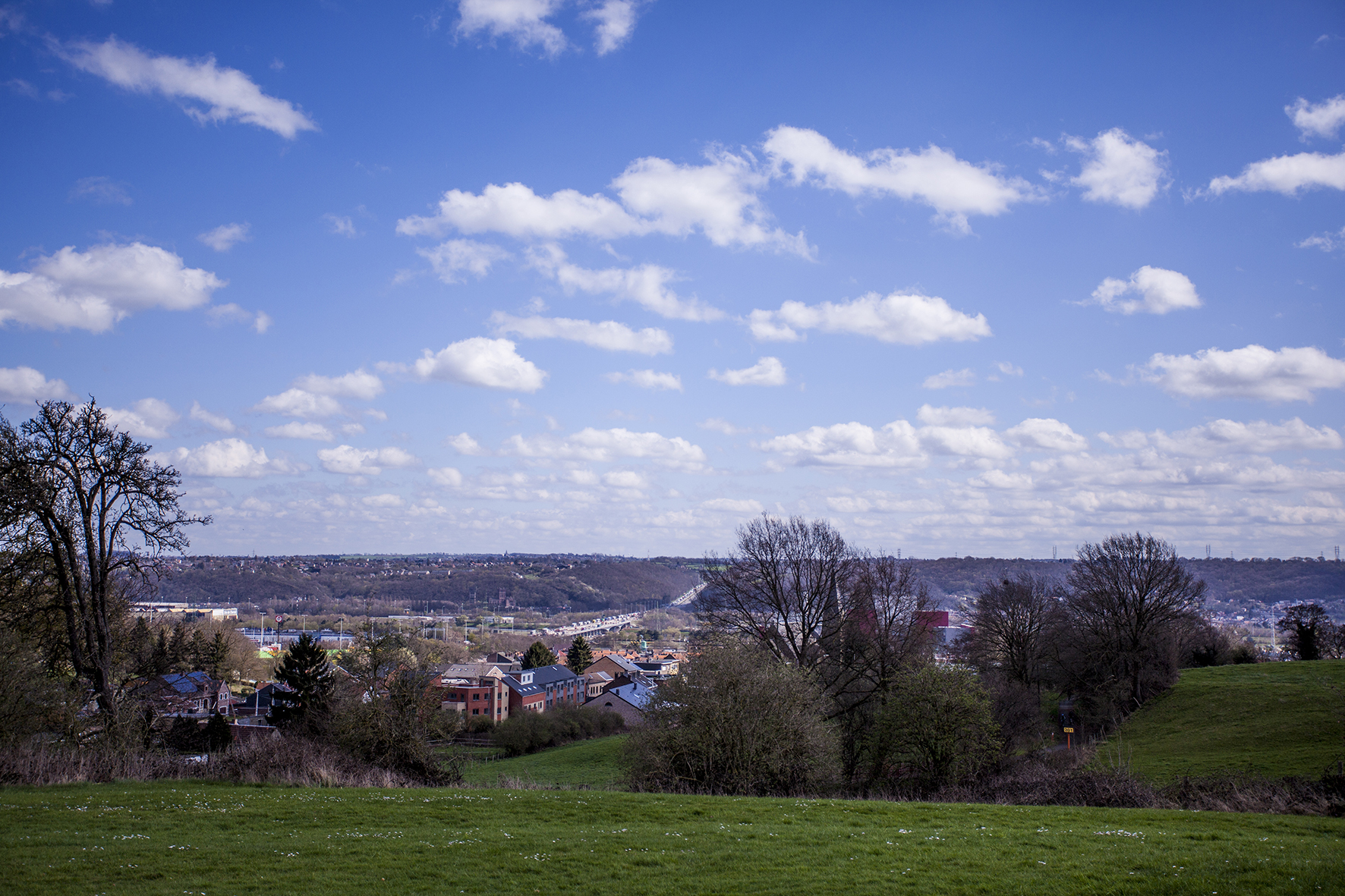
- View from the heights of Herstal

- Flag Coat of arms

- Location of Herstal in Liège province
- Interactive map of Herstal
- Location in Belgium
- Coordinates: 50°40′N 05°38′E
- Country: Belgium
- Community: French Community
- Region: Wallonia
- Province: Liège
- Arrondissement: Liège

Government
  - Mayor: Frédéric Daerden (PS)
  - Governing party: PS-H

Area
  - Total: 23.36 km^{2} (9.02 sq mi)

Population (2018-01-01)
  - Total: 39,958
  - Density: 1,711/km^{2} (4,430/sq mi)
- Postal codes: 4040-4042
- NIS code: 62051
- Area codes: 04
- Website: www.herstal.be

Herstal (French pronunciation: [ɛʁstal]; Walloon: Hesta), formerly known as Heristal, or Héristal (pronounced [eʁistal]), is a municipality and city of Wallonia located in the province of Liège, Belgium. It lies along the Meuse river. Herstal is included in the "Greater Liège" agglomeration, which counts about 600,000 inhabitants.

The municipality consists of the following districts: Herstal, Liers, Milmort, and Vottem.

A large armaments factory, the Fabrique Nationale or FN, and the biggest industrial zone of Wallonia (Haut-Sart) provide employment locally.

== History ==
=== Merovingian and Carolingian golden age ===
The name Herstal is of Franconian origin, consisting of the elements hari ("army") and stal ("resting place", "camp"; compare Modern German Stall, "stable"). The first mention of Herstal is in Latin documents from ±718 (Cheristalius corrected to Charistalius) and 723 (Harastallius). The first possibly non-Latinized occurrences are Eristail (in 919) and Harstail (1197).

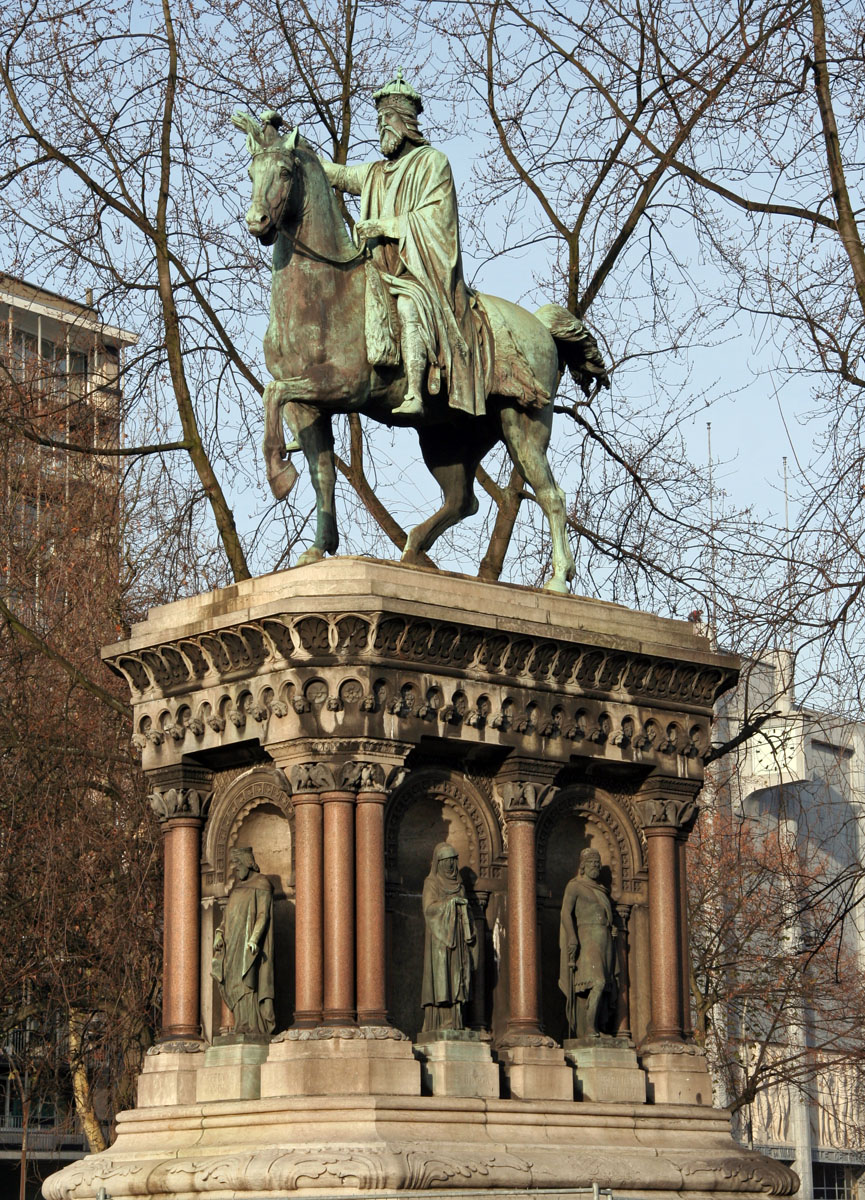
Monument to Charlemagne, Liège, Louis Jéhotte, sculptor, 1867

Pippin of Herstal (ca 635–714), Mayor of the Palace and de facto ruler of Austrasia and Neustria and founder of the family that established the Carolingian dynasty, probably chose this location as his main residence because of its proximity to the major cities of Tongeren, Maastricht, and Liège. Pippin was the father of Charles Martel, victor of the decisive Battle of Tours that stopped the Arab-Muslim advance into northwestern Europe, and great-grandfather of Charlemagne, also supposedly born in Herstal. Charlemagne lived for at least fifteen years in Herstal but later established his capital in Aachen, ending Herstal's period of medieval glory as capital of the empire.

=== Late Middle Ages and modern era ===
The town was incorporated into the Duchy of Lower Lotharingia, which became part of the Duchy of Brabant at the end of the 12th century. Despite its proximity to Liège, the territory of Herstal did not become part of the Prince-Bishopric of Liège until 1740, when the prince-bishop Georges-Louis de Berghes bought it from Frederick II of Prussia. By that time, the town was mainly known for its able craftsmen: ceramists, blacksmiths, and clockmakers.

In the 19th century, Herstal became a city of coal and steel. It would, however, become world-famous thanks to the foundation of the Fabrique Nationale, a major armament factory, in 1889. Several motorcycle manufacturers also established themselves in town. On August 7, 1914, at the very beginning of World War I, the invading German army executed 27 civilians and destroyed 10 homes in Herstal.

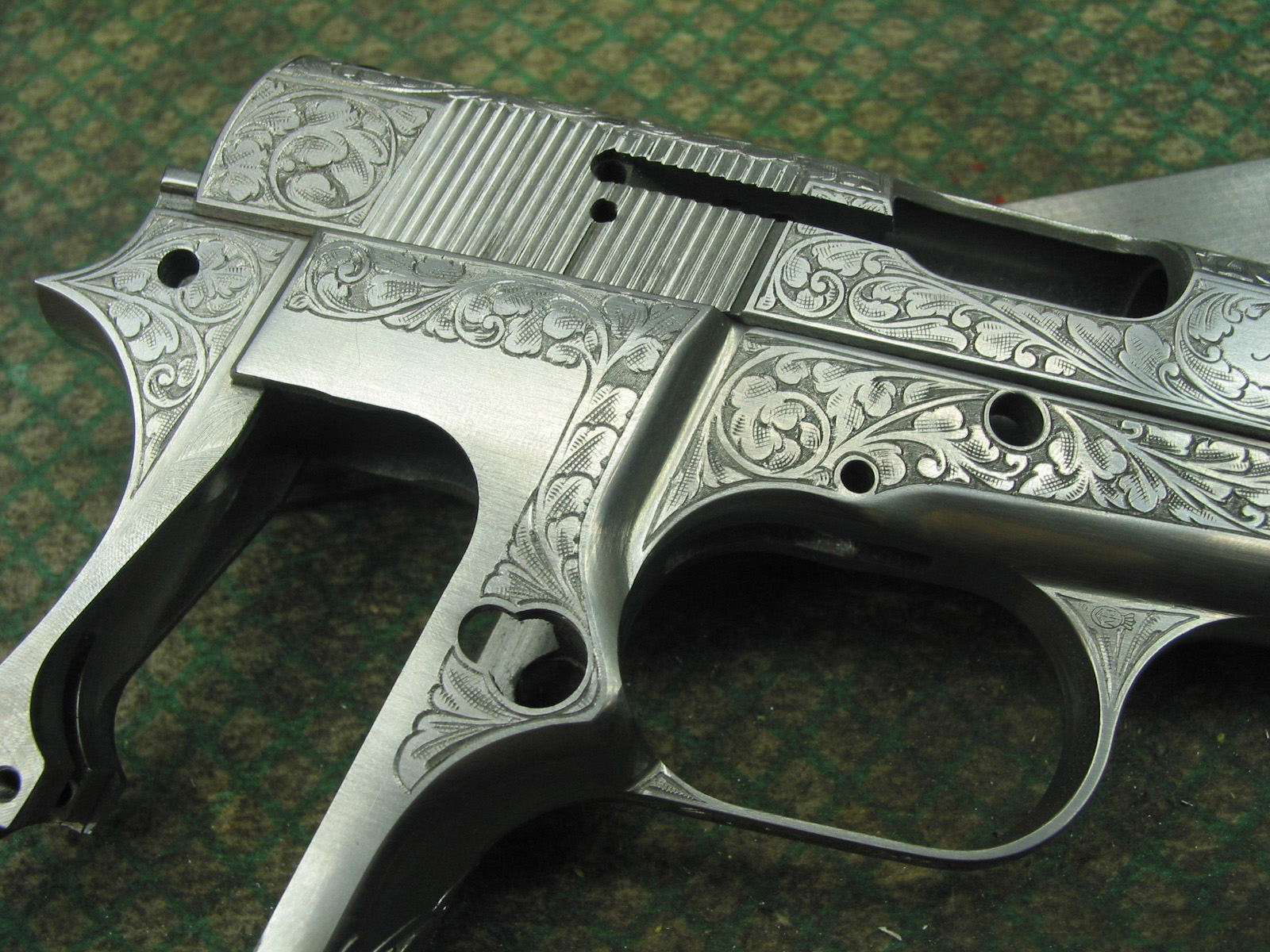
Engraved firearm from the Fabrique Nationale

After World War II, heavy industry saw a prolonged period of decline, drastically reducing the number of jobs in these areas. Today, Herstal's economy is picking up again, with more than 200 companies established on its territory, including Techspace Aero, which manufactures precision parts for the European Space Agency’s Ariane rocket.

== Politics ==
Municipal head
Mayor	Frédéric Daerden (PS)
Deputies	Franco Ianeri (PS); Marc Haeken (PS); Jean-Louis Lefebvre (PS); Christian Laverdeur (PS); Léon Campstein (PS); André Namotte (E.P.H.); Isabelle Thomsin (PS)

Party	%	Diff. 2000	Seat	Diff 2000	Leader
PS	50,86	-1,14	20	-1	Albert Crépin
EPH (PSC)	18,99	+2,59	6	+1	Norbert Weytjens
MR (PRL)	14,14	+3,24	4	+1	Jennifer Maus
PTB	9,38	+2,18	2	0	Nadia Moscufo
ECOLO	6,62	-2,28	1	-1	Anne-Marie Meunier-Balthasart

Herstal is a left-wing/socialist stronghold. It was also the strongest area in support of the far-left Workers' Party of Belgium in the 2019 elections, gaining 27.55% of the votes in Herstal.

== Notable people ==
- Pippin of Herstal, Mayor of the Palace of Austrasia, Neustria and Burgundy (635 or 640–714)
- Charles Martel, Mayor of the Palace and Duke of the Franks (686–741)
- Charlemagne, king of the Franks and founder of the Holy Roman Empire (742 or 747–814, birth in Herstal is uncertain)
- John Browning, American firearms designer (1855–1926)

== Twin cities ==
- Italy: Castelmauro
- Scotland: Kilmarnock
- France: Alès

== See also ==
- Rida (River)
