= Melchior Wathelet Jr. =

Belgian politician

Melchior Wathelet
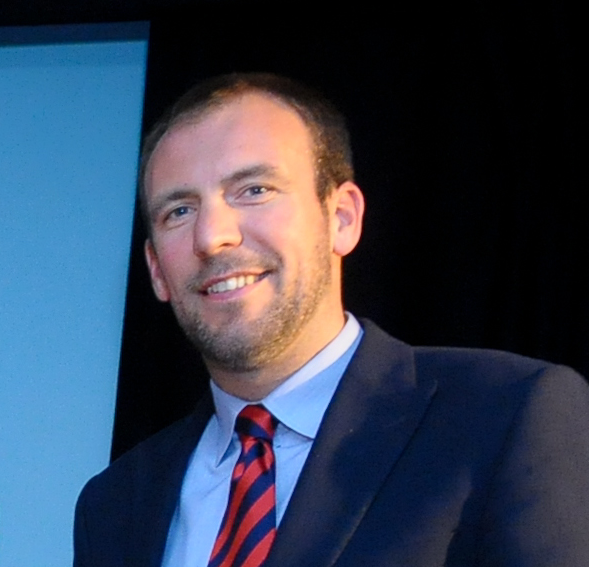
- Melchior Wathelet (January 2014)

Minister of the Interior
- In office 22 July 2014 – 11 October 2014
- Prime Minister: Elio Di Rupo
- Preceded by: Joëlle Milquet
- Succeeded by: Jan Jambon

Secretary of State of Environment, Energy, Mobility and Institutional Reforms
- In office 6 December 2010 – 22 July 2014
- Prime Minister: Elio Di Rupo
- Preceded by: Paul Magnette (Environment and Energy); Didier Reynders (Institutional Reforms)
- Succeeded by: Catherine Fonck

Personal details
- Born: 30 September 1977 (age 49) Verviers, Belgium
- Party: Humanist Democratic Centre
- Education: Catholic University of Louvain; University of Southampton
- Website: Official website

Melchior Wathelet (born 30 September 1977 in Verviers) is a Belgian politician, Secretary of State of Environment, Energy, Mobility and Institutional Reforms, and member of the Centre démocrate humaniste (cdH). His father is Melchior Wathelet. He followed part of his secondary education in Dutch at a school in Bilzen, Limburg. After a degree in law from the Catholic University of Louvain and a Master of European Law from the University of Southampton, he became lawyer at the Bar association of Liège in 2002.

He started his political career in 2003, when he was elected as member of the Belgian Chamber of Representatives where he quickly became group member for his party and second vice-president of the cdH.

He became secretary of state in charge of the budget in the Leterme II Government, and kept this charge in the Van Rompuy I Government and the Leterme II Government.

He became secretary of state in charge of Environment, Energy and Mobility in the Di Rupo I Government in 2010. After the 2014 elections on 22 July 2014 Joelle Milquet resigned to become minister of Lower education and Culture in the Government of the French Community. She was replaced as Deputy-Prime Minister and Minister of the interior by Wathelet.

== Plan Wathelet ==
On 6 February 2014 Melchior Wathelet - in his function as secretary of state in charge of Environment, Energy and Mobility - implemented a plan that reorganizes the departure routes from Brussels National Airport in Zaventem. One of the goals of the plan was to spread airplane traffic over a wider area. As a result of this plan, the majority of departing aircraft are routed over densely populated areas of Brussels. This plan – referred to by campaigners as the Plan Wathelet – soon became the object of controversy and led to a wave of complaints by residents affected by aircraft noise. A revision of the plan was blocked by the government of Flanders in early May.

The question of how to route the airline traffic from Zaventem airport, which is located near to the urban area of Brussels has been a contentious political issue for many years. The jurisdictional complexity of the region, and the multitude of intersecting political priorities makes an agreement hard to find with the different Belgian regions, communes and political parties each pushing different agendas. The plan played a role in the federal and regional elections of May 2014, leading to poor results for Wathelet's party, and a solution is not likely until after the formation of a federal government.

The main criticisms centered on the following facts:

- Plan Wathelet was introduced without any prior consultation with local residents. In other European Countries, such a consultation process is a regulatory requirement before any change to aircraft routes (standard terminal arrival routes, STARs, and standard instrument departures, (SIDs) can be published. Furthermore no impact assessment had been carried out prior to the publication of the new departure routes.

Wathelet’s problem management also came under discussion.

- Melchior accused residents’ groups of pursuing an ulterior political agenda against him.
- After the implementation of the plan, the Brussels minister for Environment Evelyne Huytebroeck claimed that the number of residents affected by aircraft noise was much larger than originally announced by Wathelet. Wathelet initially dismissed this claim and other criticisms as unsubstantiated. In May 2014, a study by the Free University of Brussels confirmed that the number of residents subjected to aircraft noise has tripled in comparison to the previously used departure routes.

== Notes ==
Political offices
Preceded by Joëlle Milquet	Minister of the Interior; 2014	Succeeded by Jan Jambon
