= Kattrin Jadin =

Belgian politician

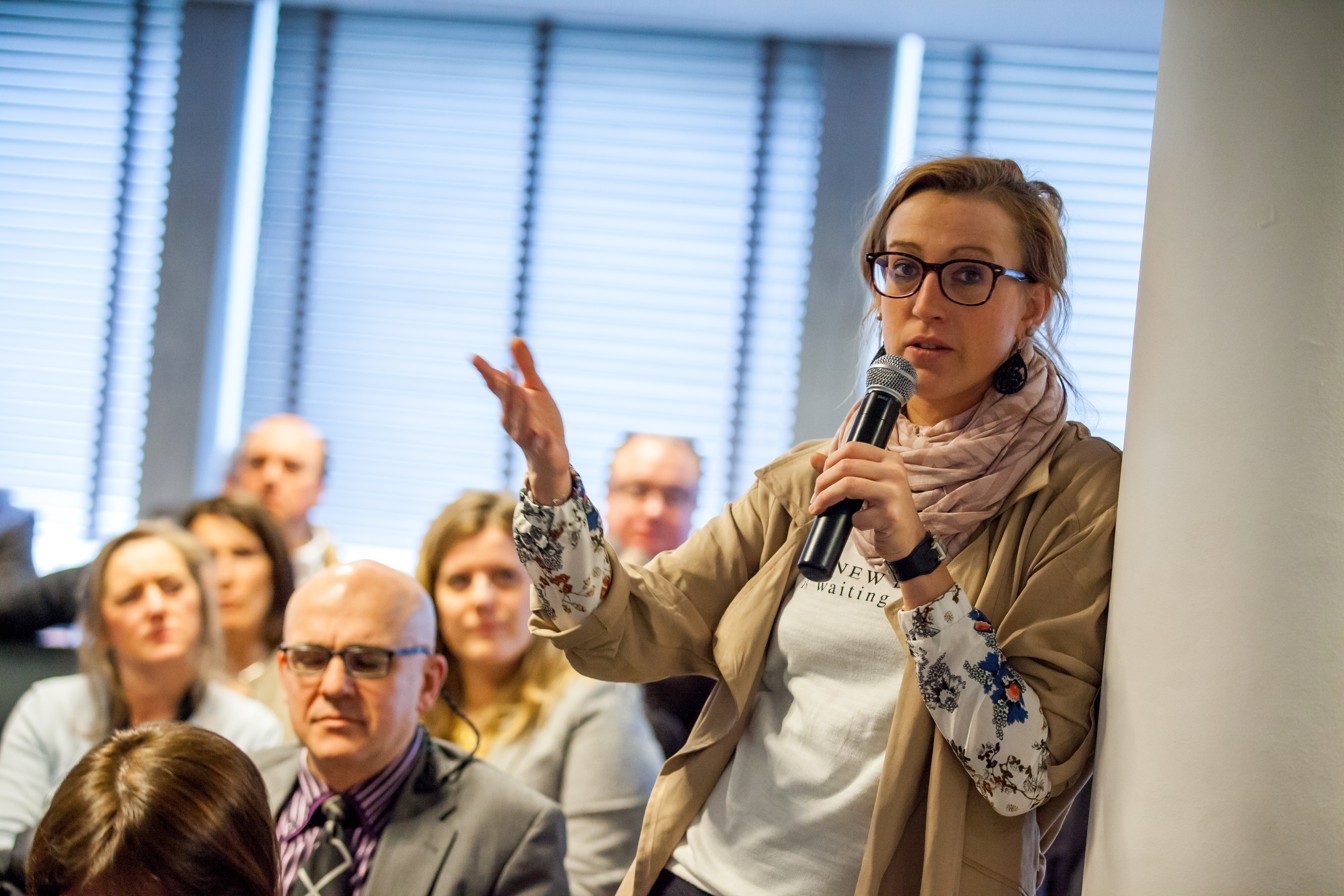
Kattrin Jadin, speaking at a party meeting in 2015

Kattrin Jadin (born 1 July 1980) is a Belgian judge. Since September 2022 she serves as a member of the Belgian Constitutional Court.

== Career ==
She ran for the Chamber of Representatives for the first time in 2004, failing to be elected. She ran again in 2007, successfully being elected. In 2009, she was named president of the Partei für Freiheit und Fortschritt. She served in parliament until 2022.

In 2015, she was part of the parliament's inquiry commission into the Volkswagen emissions scandal.

In 2017, she stated that she was in favour of opening a debate on the legalisation of cannabis in Belgium.

In 2019, she was among the candidates rumoured to be running for the leadership of the Reformist Movement. In the end, she chose not to run, endorsing the campaign of Georges-Louis Bouchez instead. In October 2019, she proposed a bill to extend the period in which abortion is legal in Belgium from until 12 weeks after conception to until 18 weeks.

In 2022 she was appointed a member of the Belgian Constitutional Court.

== Personal life ==
She has a degree in political science and international relations from the Université de Liège, graduating in 2003.
