= Arrondissement of Huy =

Arrondissement in Wallonia, Belgium

Arrondissement of Huy Arrondissement de Huy
- Arrondissement
- Location of the arrondissement in Liège Province
- Coordinates: 50.5°N 5.25°E
- Country: Belgium
- Region: Wallonia
- Province: Liège
- Municipalities: 17

Area
  - Total: 659.36 km^{2} (254.58 sq mi)

Population (1 January 2017)
  - Total: 112,786
  - Density: 171.05/km^{2} (443.03/sq mi)
- Time zone: UTC+1 (CET)
  - Summer (DST): UTC+2 (CEST)

The Arrondissement of Huy (French: Arrondissement de Huy; Dutch: Arrondissement Hoei) is one of the four administrative arrondissements in the Walloon province of Liège, Belgium.

== Municipalities ==
The Administrative Arrondissement of Huy consists of the following municipalities:

- Amay
- Anthisnes
- Burdinne
- Clavier
- Engis
- Ferrières
- Hamoir
- Héron
- Huy
- Marchin
- Modave
- Nandrin
- Ouffet
- Tinlot
- Verlaine
- Villers-le-Bouillet
- Wanze
