= Frédéric Daerden =

Belgian politician

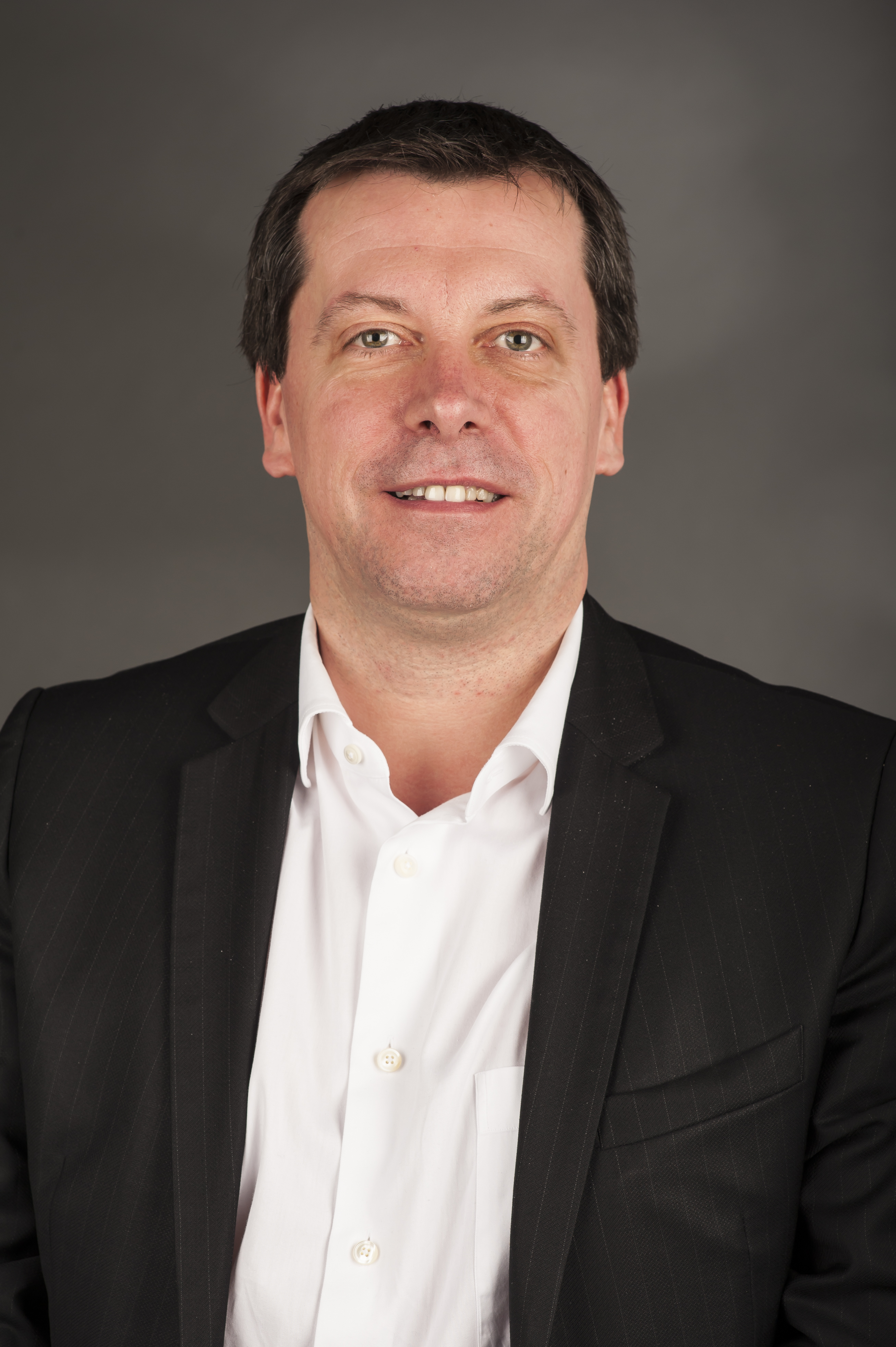
- Born: 11 January 1970 (age 56); Montegnée
- Occupation: politician

Frédéric Daerden (born 11 January 1970, in Montegnée) is a Belgian politician and a member of the French-speaking Socialist Party.

Daerden has been mayor of Herstal since 2006 and a member of the European Parliament since 2009.

He is the son of Michel Daerden (1949–2012).

Daerden was elected to the Belgian Federal Parliament in the 2024 Belgian federal election.
