= Rob Beenders =

Belgian politician (born 1979)

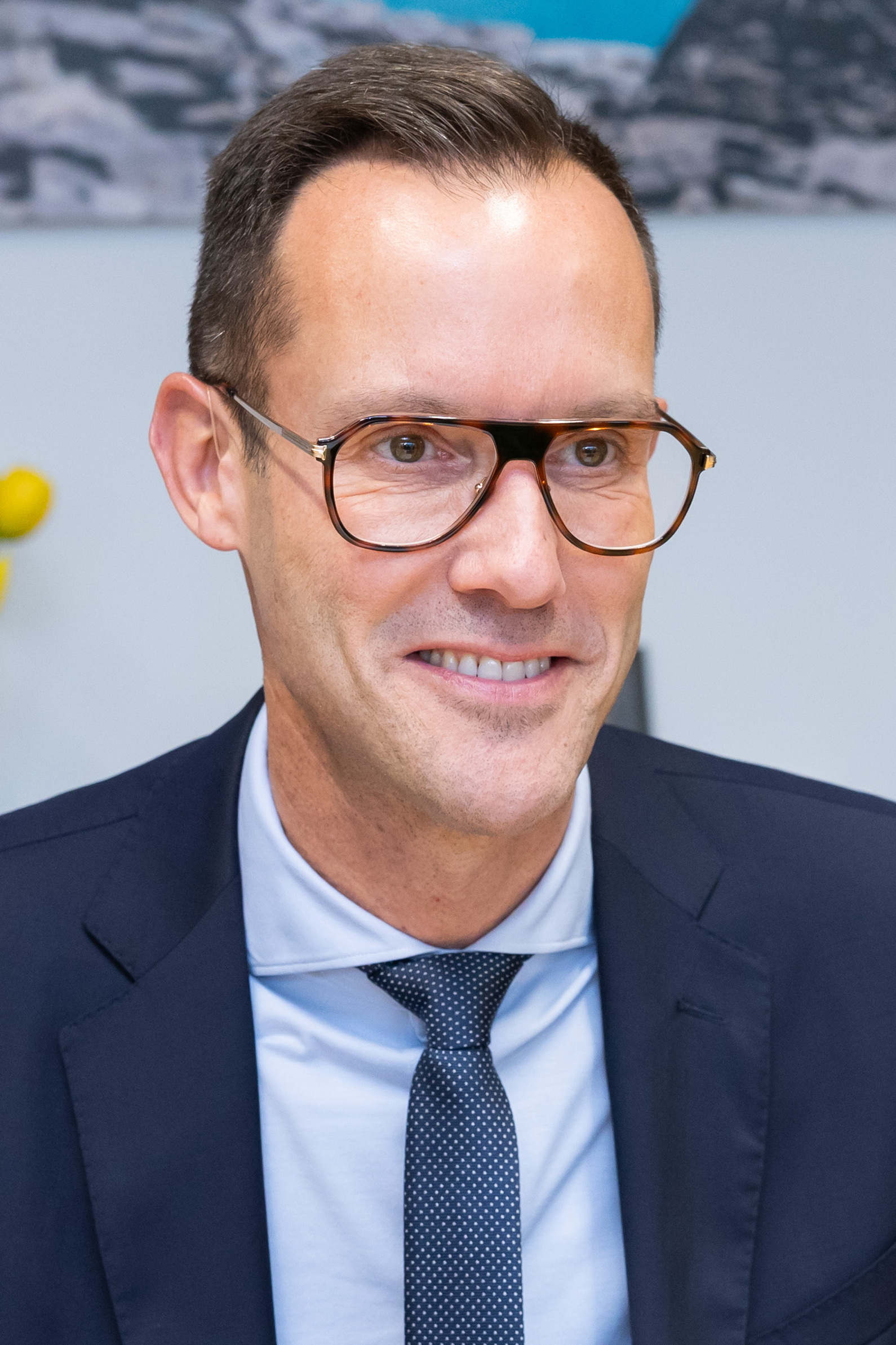
- Beenders in 2025

Minister of Consumer Affairs, Social Fraud, and Equal Opportunities
- Incumbent
- Assumed office 3 February 2025
- Preceded by: Alexia Bertrand (as Secretary of State for Consumer Protection); Marie-Colline Leroy (as Secretary of State for Gender Equality, Equal Opportunities and Diversity)

Member of the Senate
- In office 22 April 2016 – 19 June 2019
- Appointed by: Flemish Parliament

Member of the Flemish Parliament
- In office 17 June 2014 – 25 May 2019

Member of the Hasselt City Council
- In office 8 October 2006 – 14 October 2018

Personal details
- Born: 26 April 1979 (age 47) Bree, Belgium
- Party: Vooruit
- Education: Hasselt University
- Occupation: Business manager • Politician

Rob Beenders (born 26 April 1979) is a Belgian politician from Vooruit who has been serving as minister of consumer affairs, Social Fraud, and Equal Opportunities in the De Wever Government since February 2025. From 2016 to 2019, he was a member of the Senate.
