= Vanessa Matz =

Belgian politician

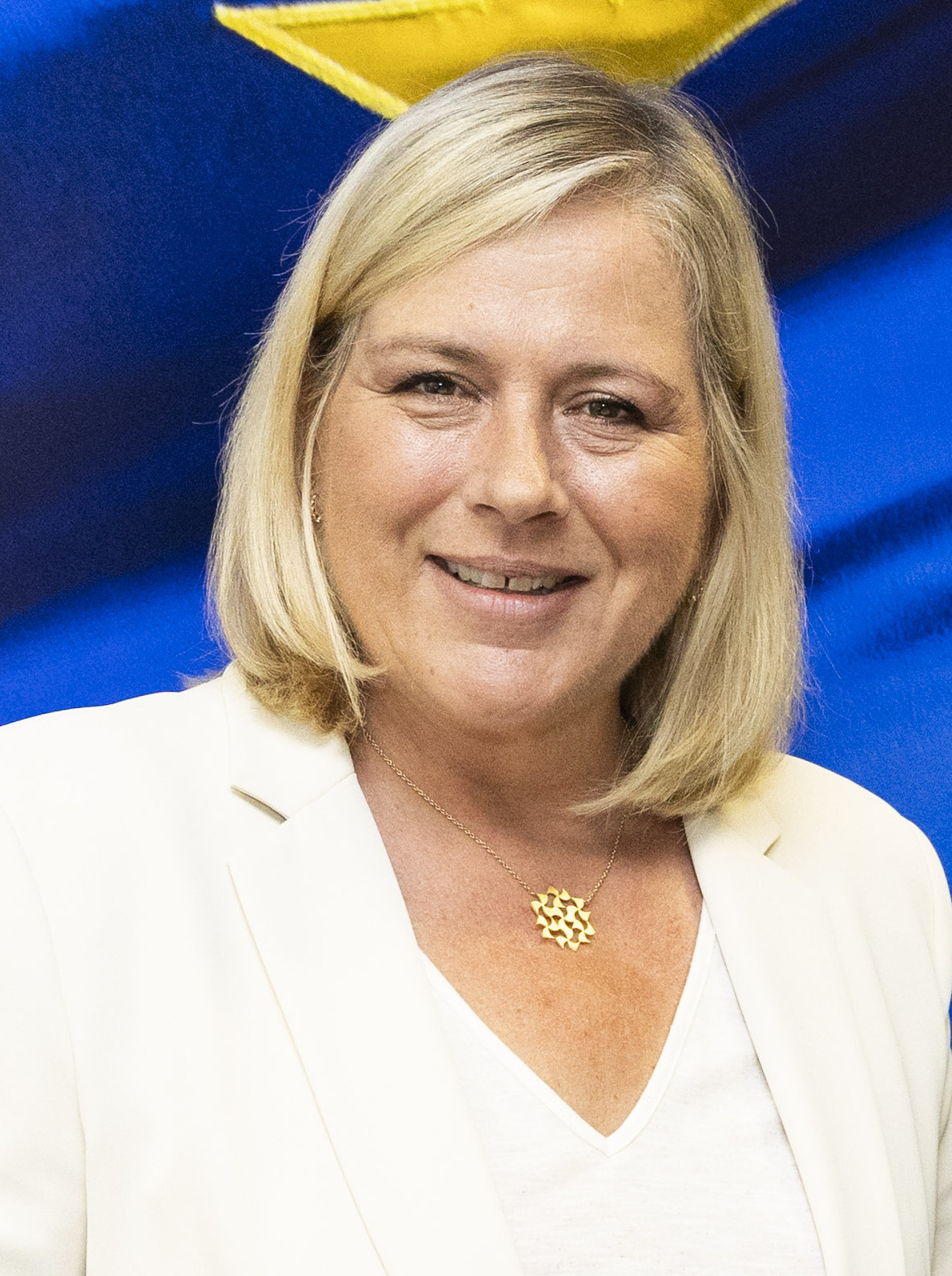
- Vanessa Matz in 2025

Minister of Public Modernisation, Civil Service, Public Enterprises, Digitisation and Buildings Administration
- Incumbent
- Assumed office 3 February 2025
- Prime Minister: Bart De Wever
- Preceded by: Petra De Sutter (as Minister of Civil Service & Public Enterprises); Mathieu Michel (as Minister of Public Modernisation, Digitisation & Buildings Administration)

Member of the Chamber of Representatives
- In office 25 May 2014 – 3 February 2025
- Succeeded by: Simon Dethier
- Constituency: Liège Province

Member of the Senate
- In office April 2008 – 25 May 2014

Member of the Aywaille City Council
- In office 9 October 1994 – 14 October 2018

Personal details
- Born: August 12, 1973 (age 53) Liège, Belgium
- Party: LE (2022–present)
- Other political affiliations: CDH (1991–2022)
- Education: University of Liège (LLL 1996)
- Occupation: Lawyer • Politician

Vanessa Matz (born 12 August 1973) is a Belgian politician and a member of the Les Engagés party. She has been serving as the Minister of Public Modernisation, Civil Service, Public Enterprises, Digitisation and Buildings Administration in the De Wever Government since February 2025. Having served as a local councillor in Aywaille from 1994 onwards, she sat in the Belgian Federal Parliament as a member of the Belgian Senate between 2008 and 2014, and was elected to the Chamber of Representatives on 25 May 2014.

== Honours and awards ==
- Order of Leopold (2024)
