= Minister of Energy (Belgium) =

This is the list of Belgian ministers of energy.

== List of ministers ==
Start	End	Minister	Party affiliation	Extra information and sources
1945	1946	Achille Van Acker	BSP	Coal
1946		Achille Van Acker	BSP	Coal
1947	1948	Achille Delattre	PSB	Fuel and energy
1960	1961	Roger de Looze	Liberal	
1961	1965	Antoon Spinoy	SP	
1981	1985	Etienne Knoops	PRL	
1985	1988	Firmin Aerts	CVP	State secretary
1988	1992	Elie Deworme	PS	State secretary
1995	1999	Jean-Pol Poncelet	PSC	
1999	2003	Olivier Deleuze	Ecolo	State secretary of energy and sustainable development
2003		Alain Zenner	MR	State secretary of energy and sustainable development
2003	2004	Fientje Moerman	Open VLD	
2004	2007	Marc Verwilghen	Open VLD	
2007	2011	Paul Magnette	PS	Climate and energy
2011	2014	Melchior Wathelet	cdH	State secretary
2014		Catherine Fonck	cdH	State secretary
2014	2020	Marie-Christine Marghem	MR	
2020	2025	Tinne Van der Straeten	Groen	
2025	present	Mathieu Bihet	MR	

== See also ==
- Energy law
