= Vottem =

Section of Herstal, Wallonia, Belgium

Coordinates: 50°40′N 05°35′E

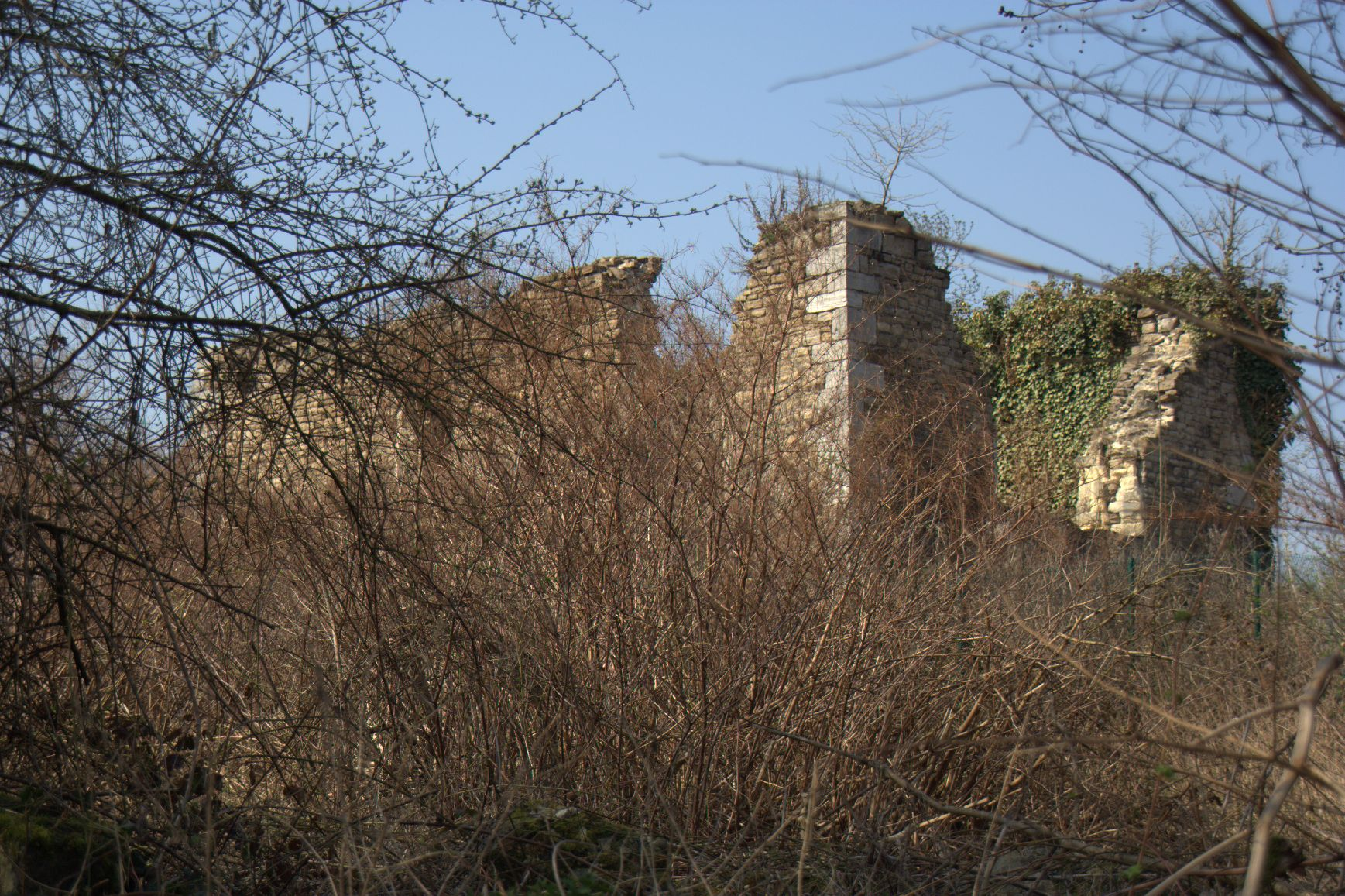
Ruins of the chapel of Bouxthay castle

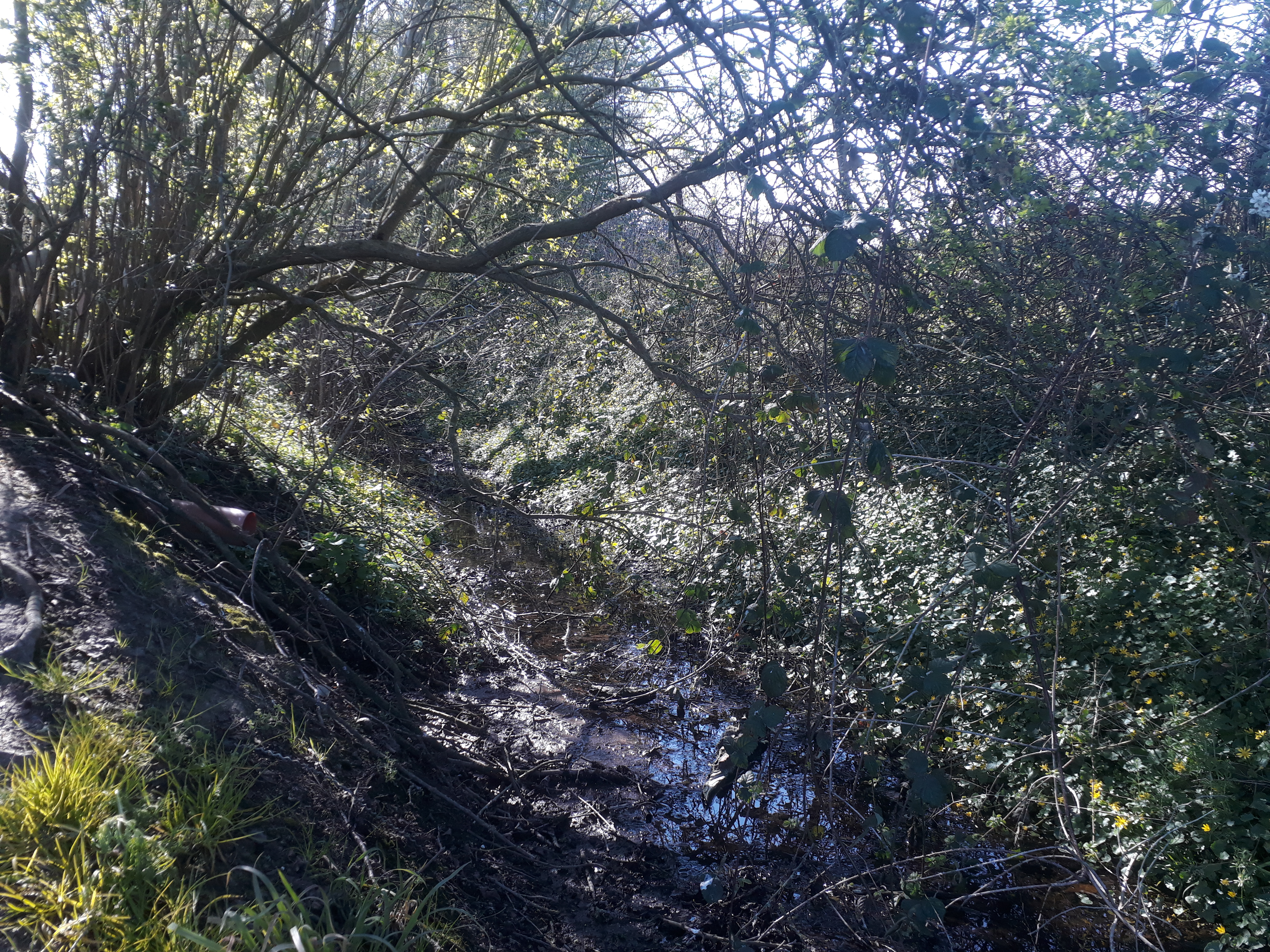
Rida River in Vottem

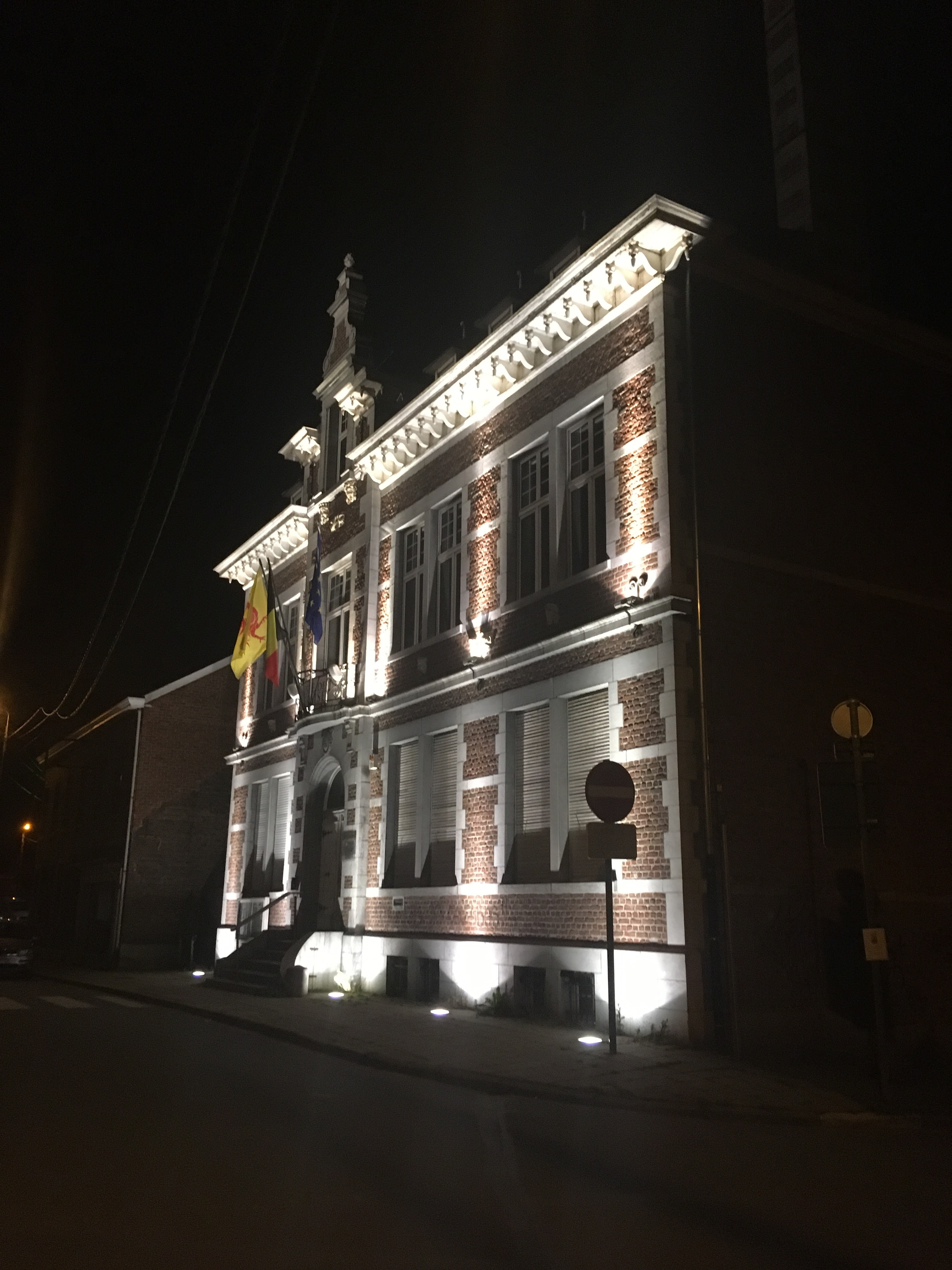
Previous municipality building

Vottem (Walloon: Votem) is a village of Wallonia and a district of the municipality of Herstal, located in the province of Liège, Belgium. The Rida river has its springs in Vottem.

It was a fully-fledged municipality up to 1976. The Jolivet and Bernalmont hamlets had already been transferred to the town of Liège in 1975.

== Hamlets and neighbourhoods ==
- Bouxhtay, Å Bouh'tè, Å Bouf'tè, hamlet mentioned since 1278
- Chapeauville, A chapêvêye, neighbourhood mentioned since 1534
- Cheval Blanc, Å blanc Dj'vå, after the "White Horse inn" that was located there
- Croix Jouette, Creû Djouwète, hamlet mentioned since 1552
- Gaillard-Cheval, Å Galiår, hamlet mentioned since 1530
- Gascogniers, Ås Cascognîs, hamlet mentioned since 1812
- Haxhes, Hå, Håhe
- Haren, Harin
- Jolivet, è Djolivè, hamlet mentioned since 1430; transferred to Liège in 1975
- Tiyou, after the Walloon word for the linden that was once growing there. There was also an old windmill, Moulin Bouquette which was destroyed around 1970 for sake of highway construction.

== Geology and soils ==
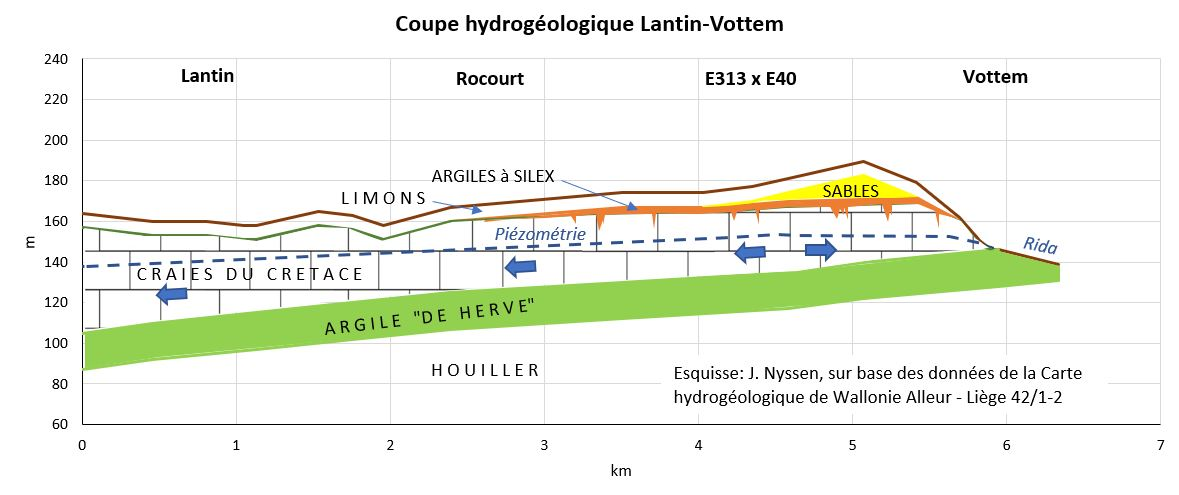
Hydrogeological cross-section Lantin Rocourt Vottem

Vottem is at the limit of the Hesbaye Plateau and the Meuse valley. From higher to lower locations in the village, there are the following geological formations:

- Pleistocene aeolian loess
- Tertiary sands (Oligocene)
- Clay with flint
- Maastrichtian chalk (Cretaceous) – makes up the Hesbaye aquifer
- Herve clay or smectite
- Sandstone, schists and coal pertaining to the Palaeozoic (also called Houiller)

Locally, near the Rida springs, freshwater tufa has been deposited.

Dominant soils in Vottem are well drained loamy soils (Ab) and gravelly loamy soils with silex, quite well drained also (Gb). The latter are directly related to outcrops of clay-with-flint. Remarkably, on the soil map, spring areas are not differentiated, most probably in relation to a low augering density (one per ha).

== Important buildings ==
- The Saint-Étienne Catholic Church dates from 1788. It is a neo-classical church, holding a squared tower at the western side, in bricks and stone. It has been restored in 1966, and the old furniture disappeared at that time. One of the church bells dated from 1838; it was stolen by the German occupier in 1943.
- Temple of the Antoinist cult

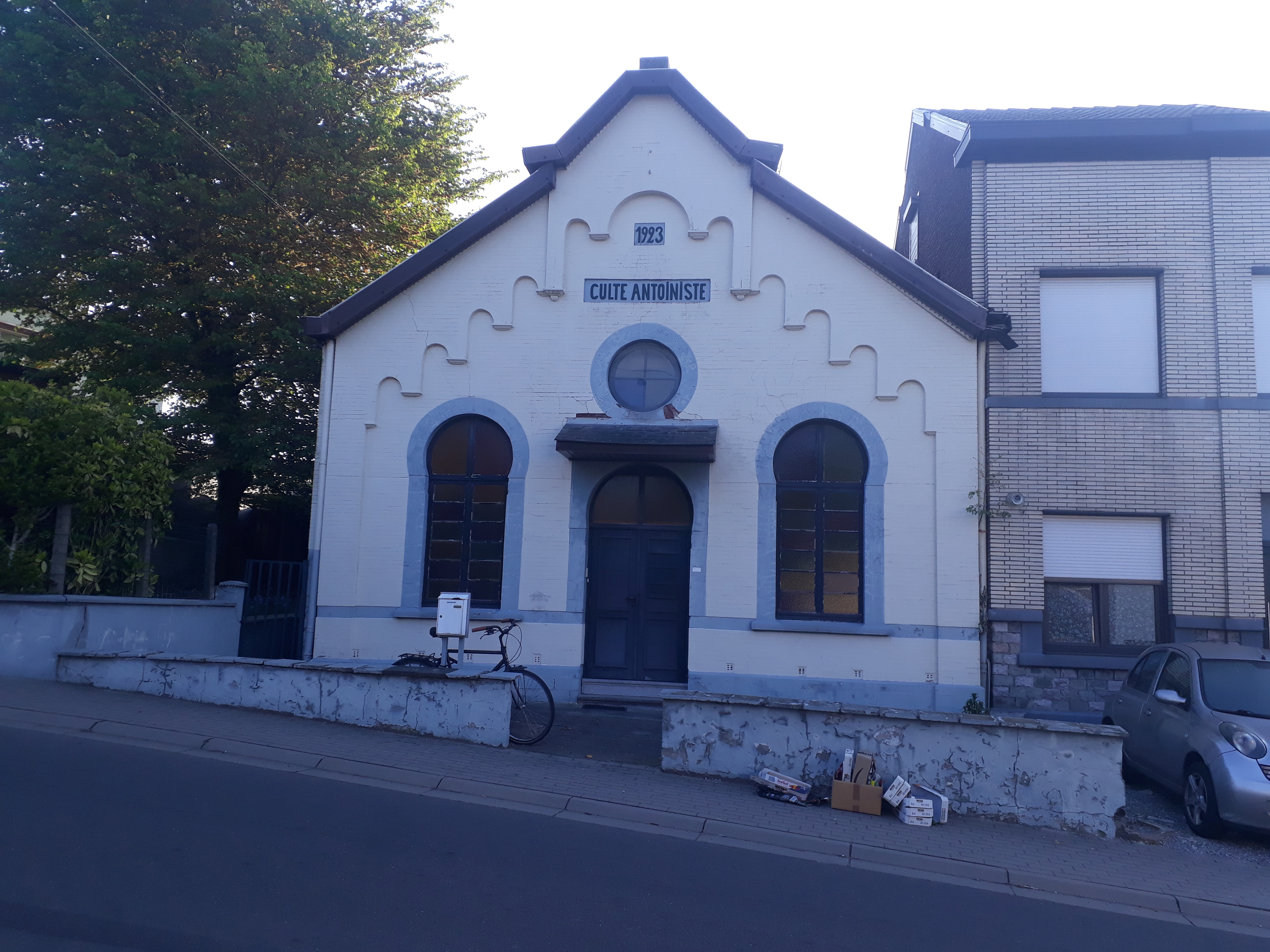
The Antoinist temple of Vottem

- Bouxthay Chapel (ruined)

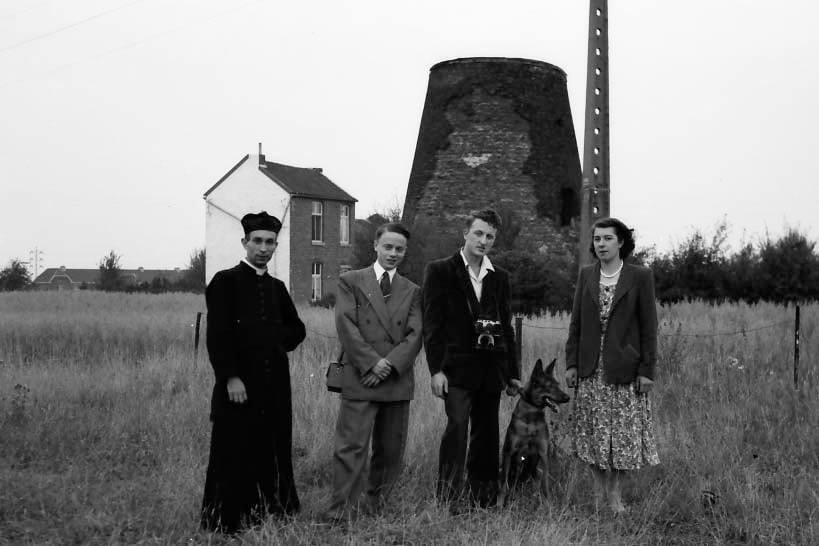
Tower of the Bouquette windmill

- There used to be two windmills in Vottem, the Moulin Depireux and the Moulin Bouquette; their towers remained in the landscape until 1970, when they were destroyed to make room for the highway.
- The "Centre pour Illégaux de Vottem" (CIV) exists since 1999. Non-accepted asylum seekers reside here, before travelling back to their home country. People sleep in rooms with four beds.

== Public footpaths ==
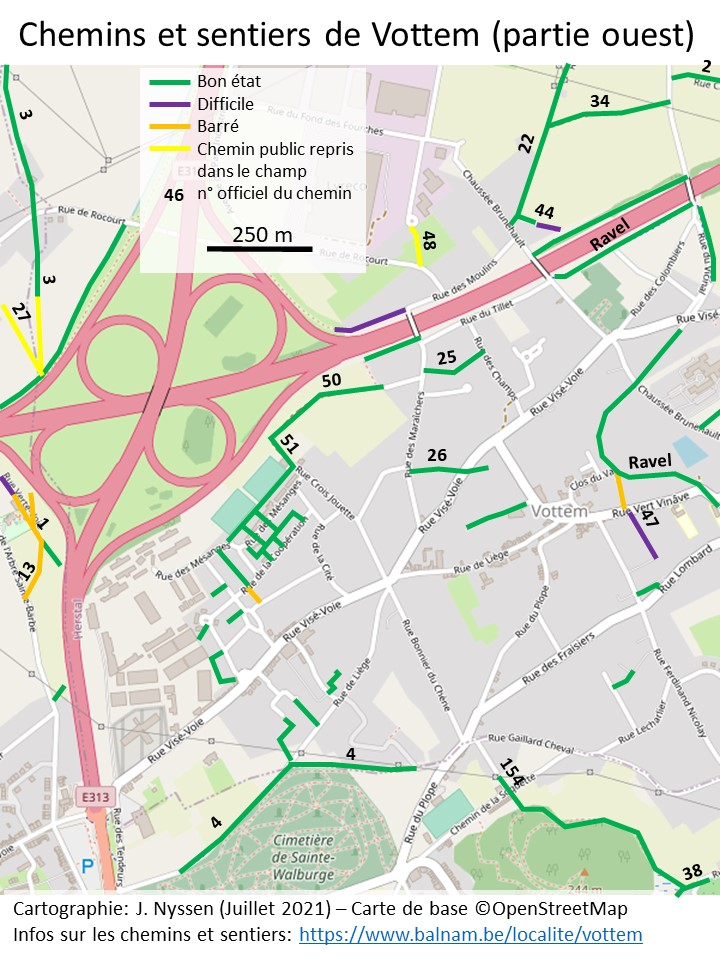
Public footpaths in Vottem (western part)

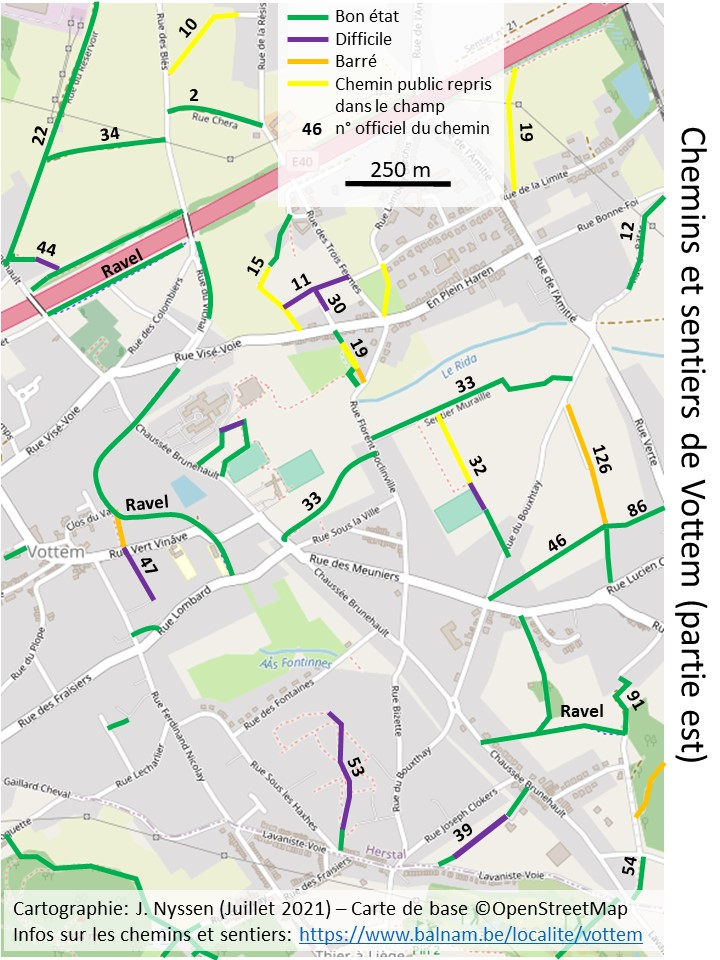
Public footpaths in Vottem (eastern part)

Vottem holds 26 km of public footpaths, out of which 14 km are in good shape, 2 km are difficult (often included in croplands), 1 km illegally closed, 2 km inaccessible with unknown status and 5 km have been officially abandoned (often for sake of highway construction). This high density of footpaths is explained by the previous dominance of horticulture in this village. The intensive work in the gardens required a lot of foot mobility; and the products were transported to the local auction market by handcarts; the width of the footpaths was adjusted to these carts: minimum 1.17 metres.

== See also ==
- Rida (River)
