= S. R. Harris =

Belgian writer

- Born: Sarah Margaret Reader Harris; 1959 (age 66–67); United Kingdom
- Occupations: Writer, poet, novelist, publisher
- Notable work: A Sheep Called Skye series
- Relatives: Dame Diana Reader Harris (aunt); John Loder, 2nd Baron Wakehurst (grandfather)

S. R. Harris or Sarah Reader Harris is a British-born Belgian writer, novelist, poet and publisher based in Brussels, best known for her children's books. Her work A Sheep Called Skye was adapted for stage by Nicola McCartney and performed at the National Theatre of Scotland in conjunction with puppeteer Ailie Cohen.

== Biography ==
S. R. Harris was born Sarah Margaret Reader Harris in 1959, the niece of Dame Diana Reader Harris and granddaughter of John Loder, 2nd Baron Wakehurst. Having graduated from Sherborne School for Girls, she attended University College London before transferring to University of Bradford.

== Children's books ==
The Skye series tells the story of a sheep by the name of Skye who lives on the Scottish Isle of Skye. Following her 2000 A Sheep Called Skye, Harris added further books to the series, including To Skye with Love, A Patch of Skye, and No Place like Skye. The first book has since gone into Dutch translation as Het Eiland van de Nevelen. She has also published several original children's books in Dutch, including Het Mysterie van de Bienoboon and Vlieglessen van een Vlegel.

== Fiction ==
In 2018, Harris's novel Plums Taste Different Here was listed for the Yeovil Literary Prize.

== Poetry ==
In 2017, Harris was shortlisted for the Bridport Prize, an international competition for creative writers.

== Activism ==
Harris has used poetry to address the European migrant crisis in Brussels. With Marieke Slovin Lewis and people living at the Fedasil Petit-Chateau Arrival Centre, Harris wrote and published On the Move: Poems and Songs of Migration.

She is active in a variety of educational and cultural programs through her writing.

Harris is also a member of the Brussels Writers' Circle.
