= Rida (river) =

River in Belgium

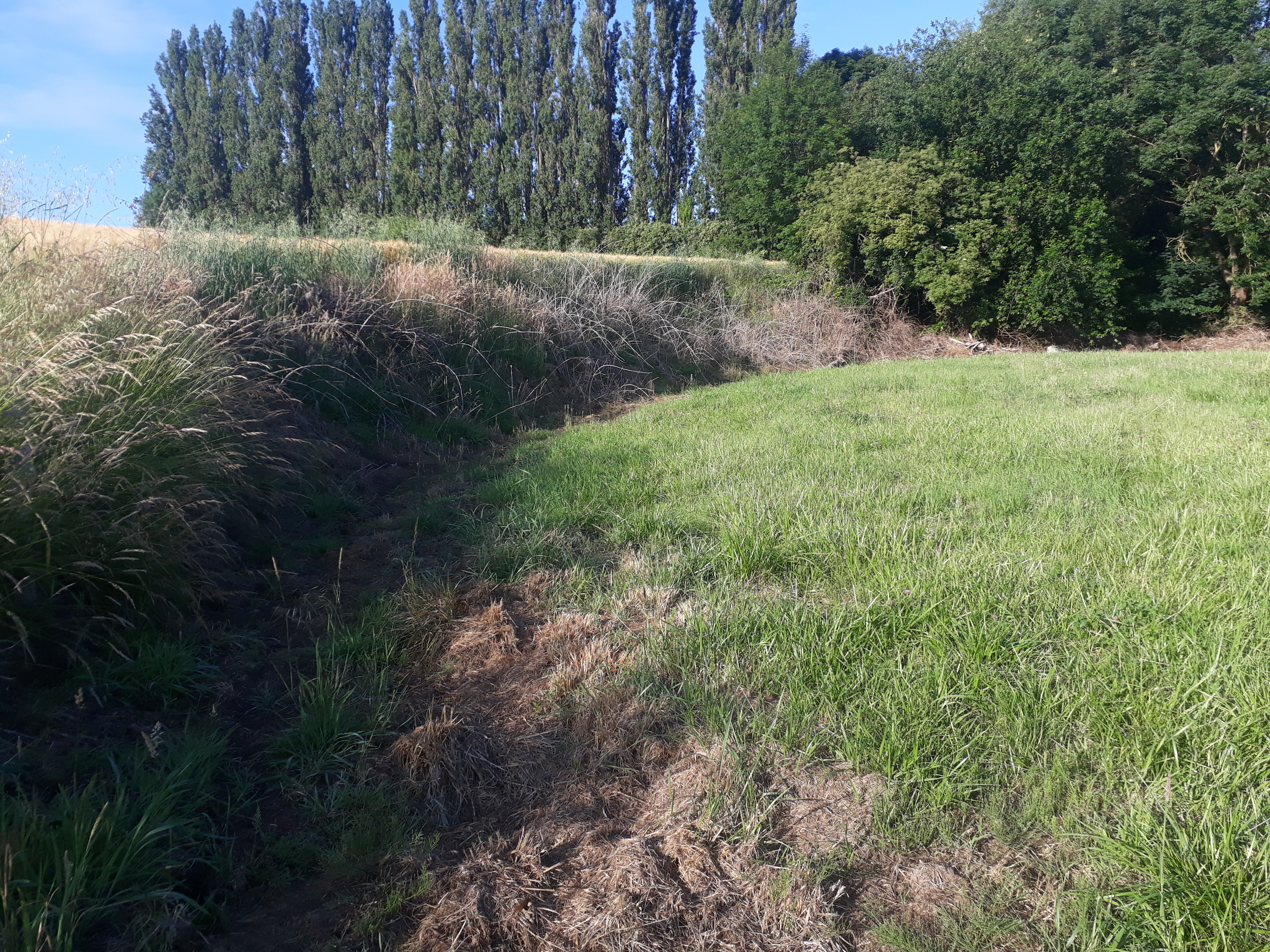

- Location within Belgium

Location
- Country: Belgium

Physical characteristics
- Mouth: Meuse at Herstal
  - coordinates: 50°40′34.49″N 5°36′27.54″E
- Length: 7 km (4.3 mi)

The Rida is a stream in Belgium, a tributary of the Meuse. It originates in Vottem, crosses the town of Herstal and flows into the Meuse.

== Geomorphology ==
The proximity of the Meuse has caused headward erosion, so the Rida valley, like the adjacent valleys between Liège and Haccourt, cuts into the edge of the plateau of dry Hesbaye and then deepens significantly into the Meuse's side, forming terraces in the shape of a ravine leading to Herstal.

The dominant soils in the Rida Valley are silty soils with favorable natural drainage (Ab) and silty stony soils laden with flint, gravel, or conglomerate and predominantly favorable natural drainage (Gb). The latter soils are directly related to outcrops of flint clay and, to a lesser extent, some fragments of Meuse's terraces. It is noteworthy that the soils in the source and marsh areas are not differentiated, likely due to the low density of boreholes (approximately one per hectare).

== Course ==
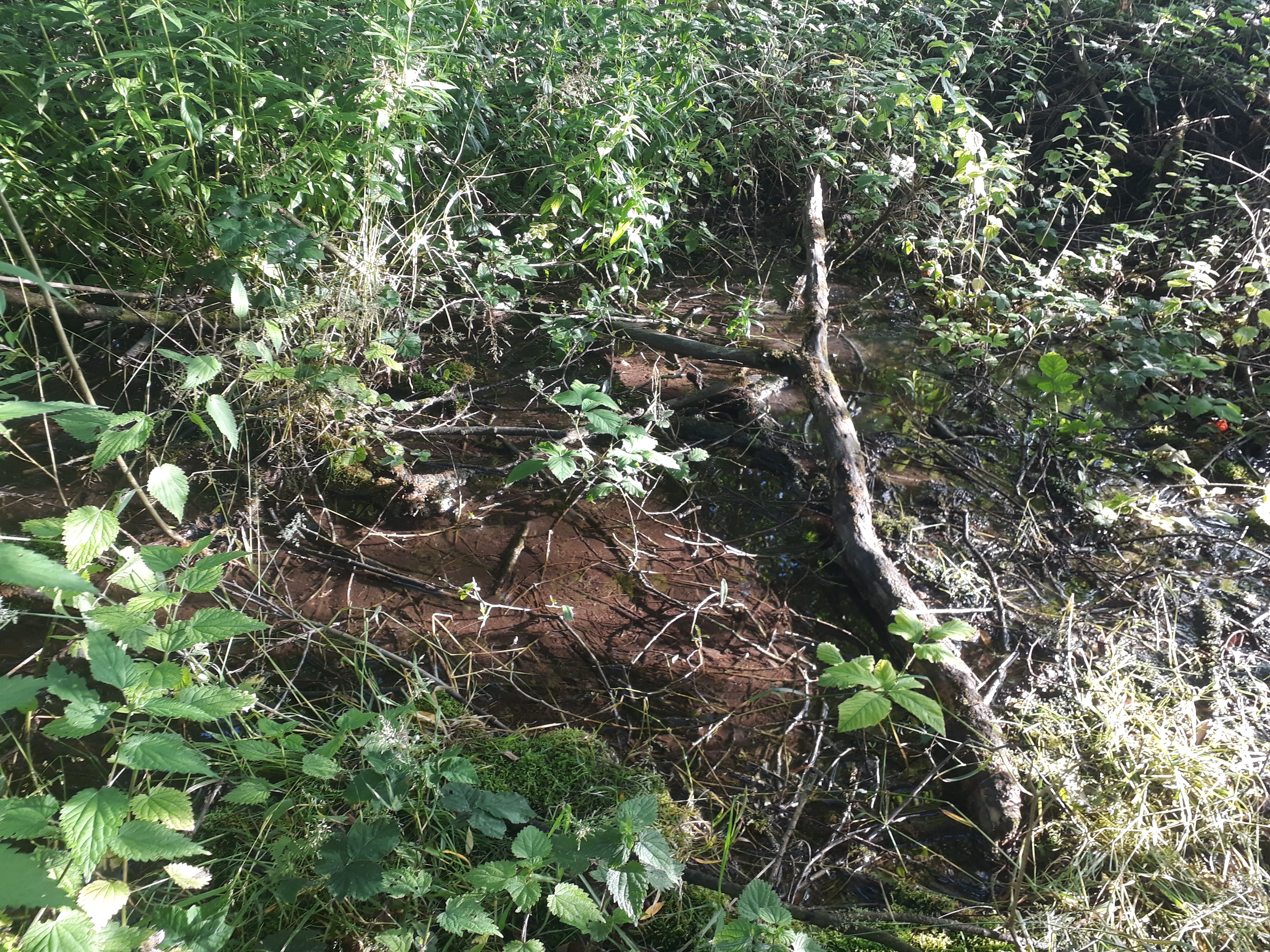
Current source of the Rida in Vottem and cranière

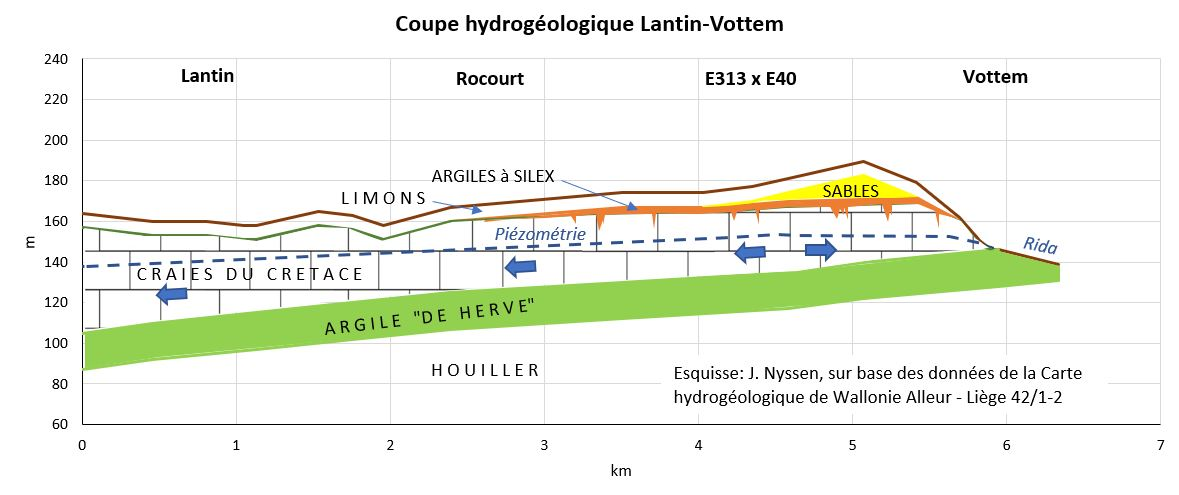

=== Spring waters ===
Water infiltrates through the Cretaceous limestone upstream and feeds the groundwater table of Haspengouw. All springs are at the level of the water surface. These are formed by the geological formation of the Herve Clay. The flow of the springs was influenced by the following phenomena:

- As the upstream basin developed, the waterproof surfaces were enlarged. During rain, surfaces of materials such as asphalt and concrete and roofs carry rainwater to sewers, rather than seeping into the ground. As a result, aquifer recharge is reduced and urban runoff into the basin increases.
- This aquifer is a "high groundwater table" (much higher than the level of the adjacent river, the Meuse); with the development of coal mines, the clay aquiclude was punctured in many places, creating vertical (downward) drainage. This water was drained lower in the subsurface by galleries and discharged into the Meuse.
- Further northwest, throughout Haspengouw, the waters of this aquifer were intercepted and pumped up.

All this caused a lowering of the piezometric level and the drying up of the springs of the Rida.

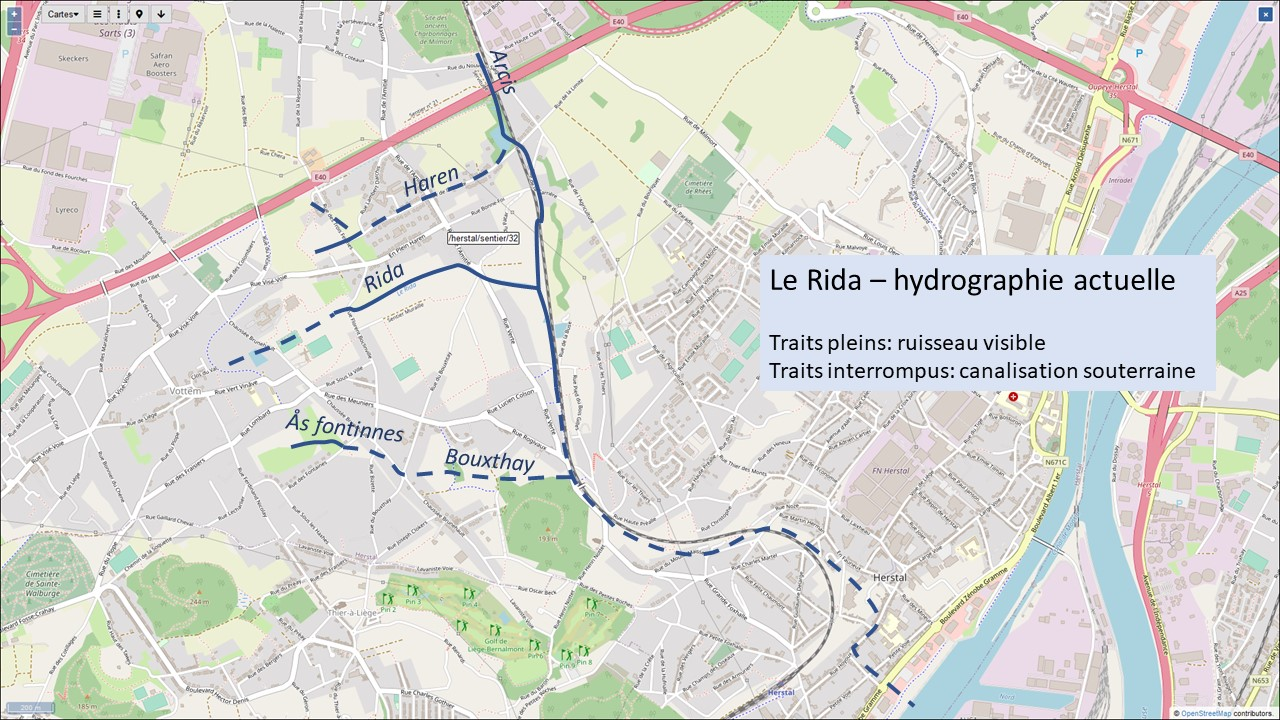
Current hydrography

Recently, a reactivation of springs was observed. A possible cause would be the gradual collapse of the mine galleries, preventing underground drainage and returning the water table to its original level.

=== The Rida ===
The main source of the Rida is located in Vottem. This ancient wetland was called li pré Cadjo, and village children bathed there. Elementary school students came by class to fish for tadpoles.

The current spring is located downstream from a former landfill. However, it produces very clear water, as evidenced by a large deposit of limestone, called cron or cranière in Wallonia. There is also the presence of gours. Such petrifying springs are quite rare north of the Meuse River.

Just downstream, along the Rida, was the farm of Ruwet, still visible on cadastral maps in 1958, with a pond where the last farmer, Mr. Colson, exploited watercress. The pond has been filled in but wild watercress still grows, downstream of the spring area.

Between Vottem and Herstal, the course is visible, but channelized; at a place called Au Patar, the Rida briefly assumes its natural morphology.

==== Ruisseau de Haren ====
The springs of the Ruisseau de Haren are located on the border of Herstal and Vottem; its flow is rarely powerful enough to reach the main Rida. One source is located in a hollow road (Chemin vicinal no. 11) at the corner of Rue des Bruyères (Chemin vicinal no. 30), all under cover of hedges and bushes (50° 41′ N, 5° 36′ E), others in Rue de la Source.

==== Ås fontinnes - Bouxthay ====
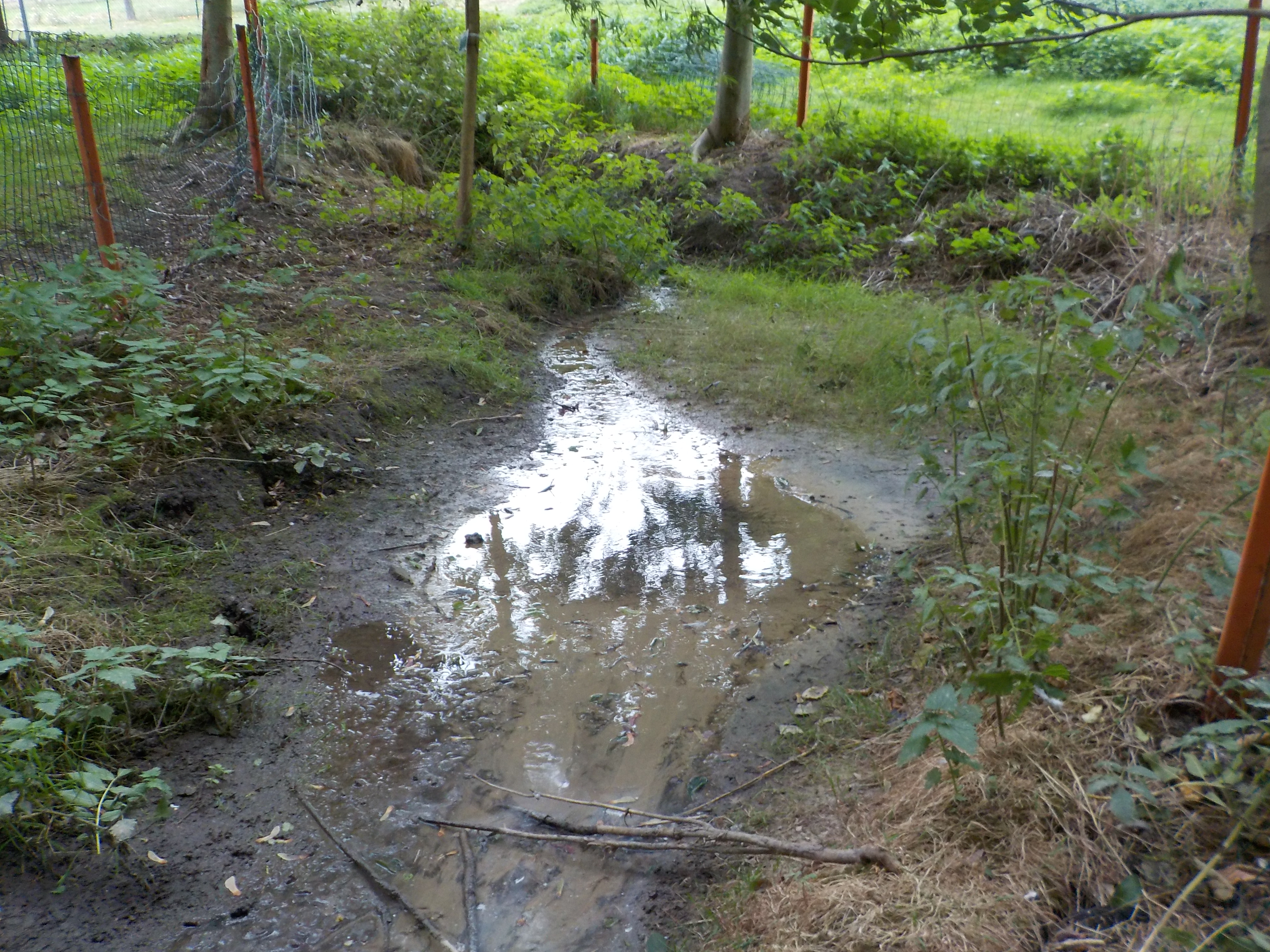
Source Ås fontinnes

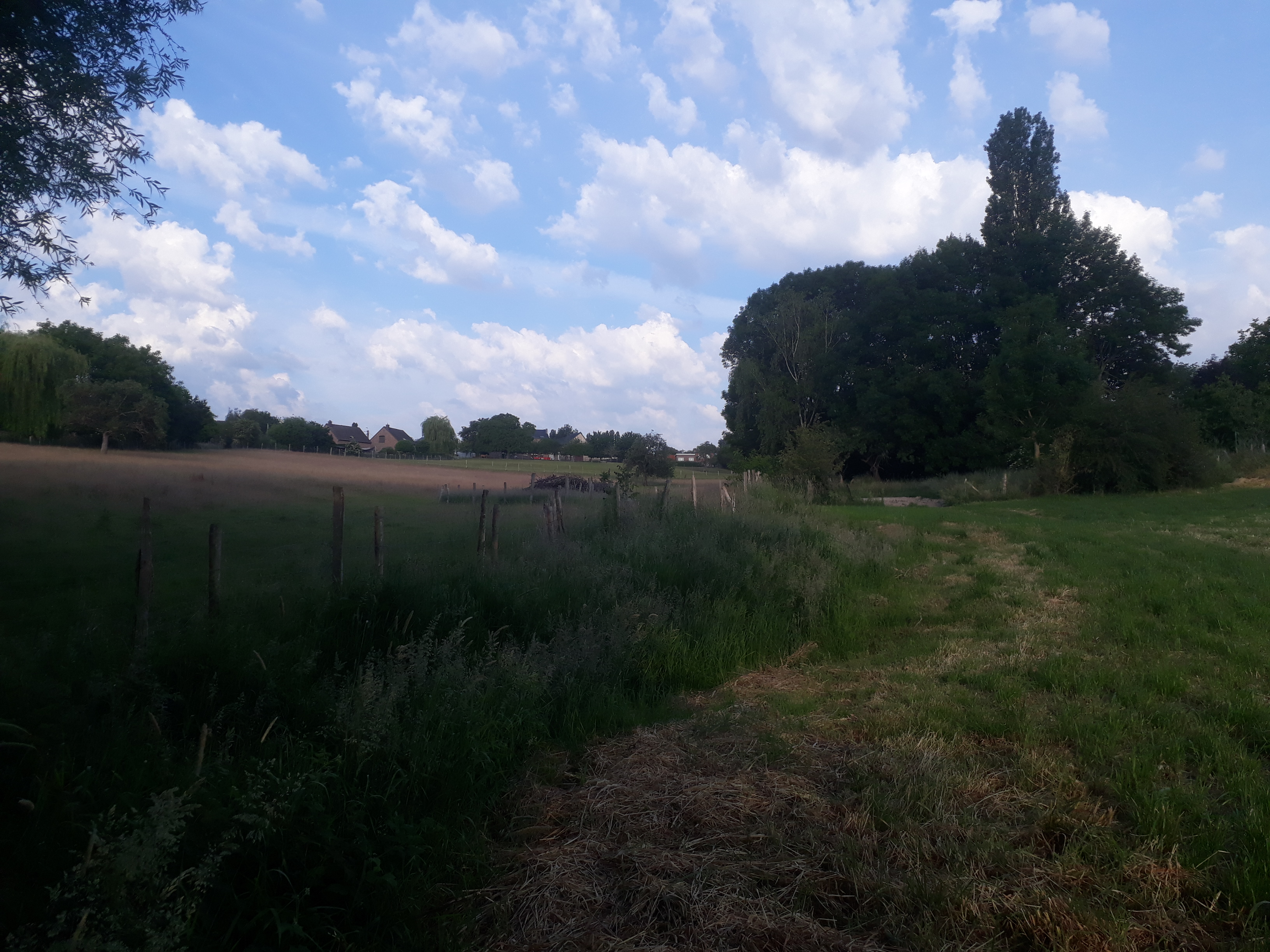
Ås fontinnes

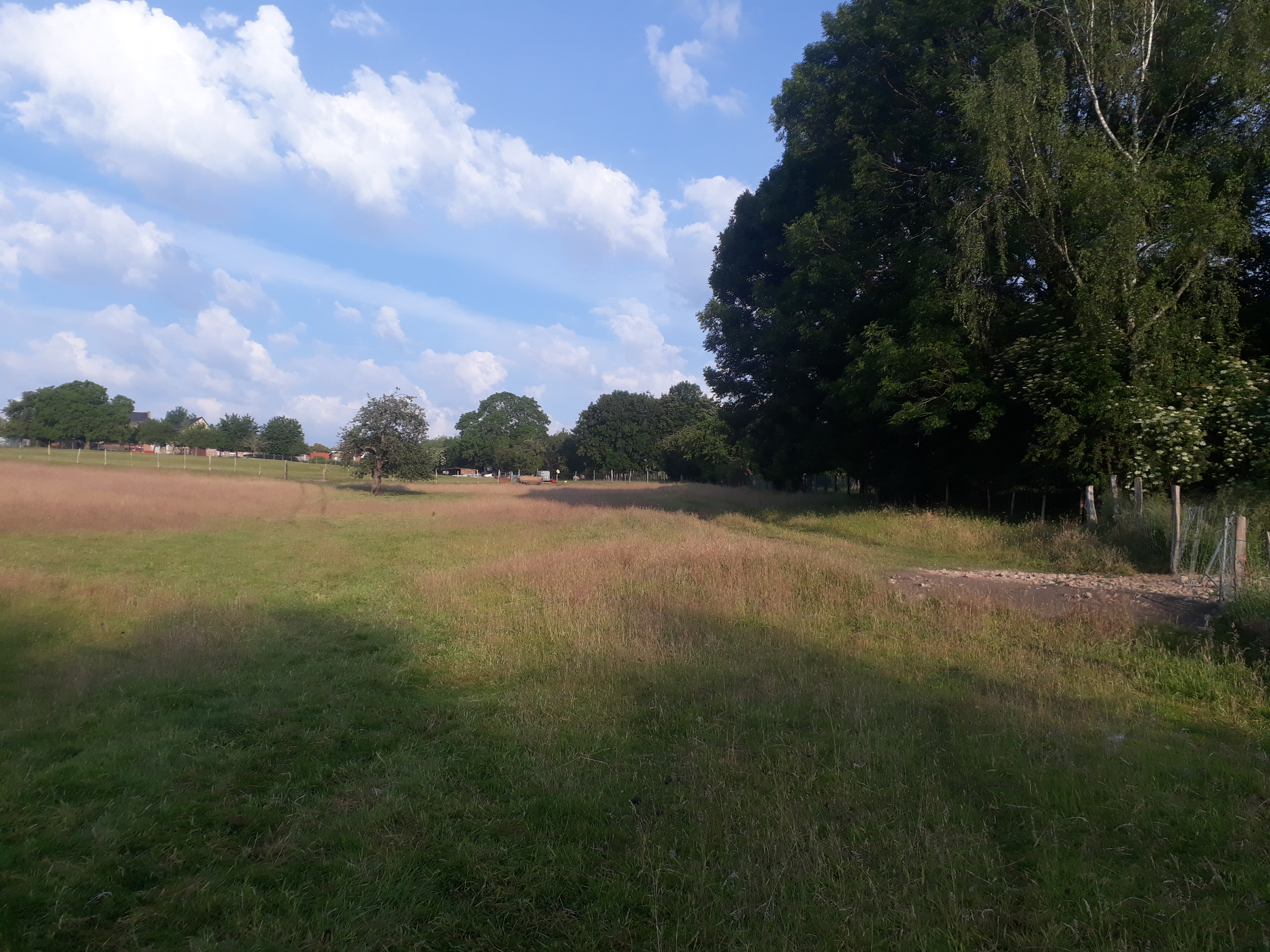
Ås fontinnes - dry valley upstream

The sources of this stream originate in a meadow, and the Ås Fontinnes stream provides a glimpse of the original rural landscape at the heads of all adjacent valleys. In the Walloon language, Ås Fontinnes means 'by the springs.' On the valley slopes, some trees remain as remnants of an old coppice. Until the 19th century, the villagers used to come here to cut wood on the Platduron hill and fetch water from the spring. The spring area is where the Herve clay day emerges. Water that infiltrated through the Cretaceous Maastrichtian comes to the surface here as a spring.

In the traditional landscape, Ås Fontinnes flowed through a marshy valley where watercress grew abundantly. The river exhibited an aquatic ecology suitable for watercress: clear, shallow, non-acidic, slow-flowing water. Local residents came to harvest this watercress in large quantities, which they then sold at the Vottem auction.

Currently, it remains an unexpected stream and landscape in a largely urbanized environment. Upstream of the springs, we can observe a dry valley (xhavée) on the chalk, followed by a stream with clear water. Reduced infiltration has undoubtedly significantly decreased the flow and altered the course to dry the meadows. The watercress has also disappeared. Ås Fontinnes still retains its semi-natural landscape characteristics.

Further downstream, the stream is named Ruisseau du Bouxthay. It is still marked on IGN maps as far as the ruins of the castle with the same name. It joins the main Rida near the current location of Rue Charlemagne. Downstream of the Fontinnes, this stream flows through a pipe.

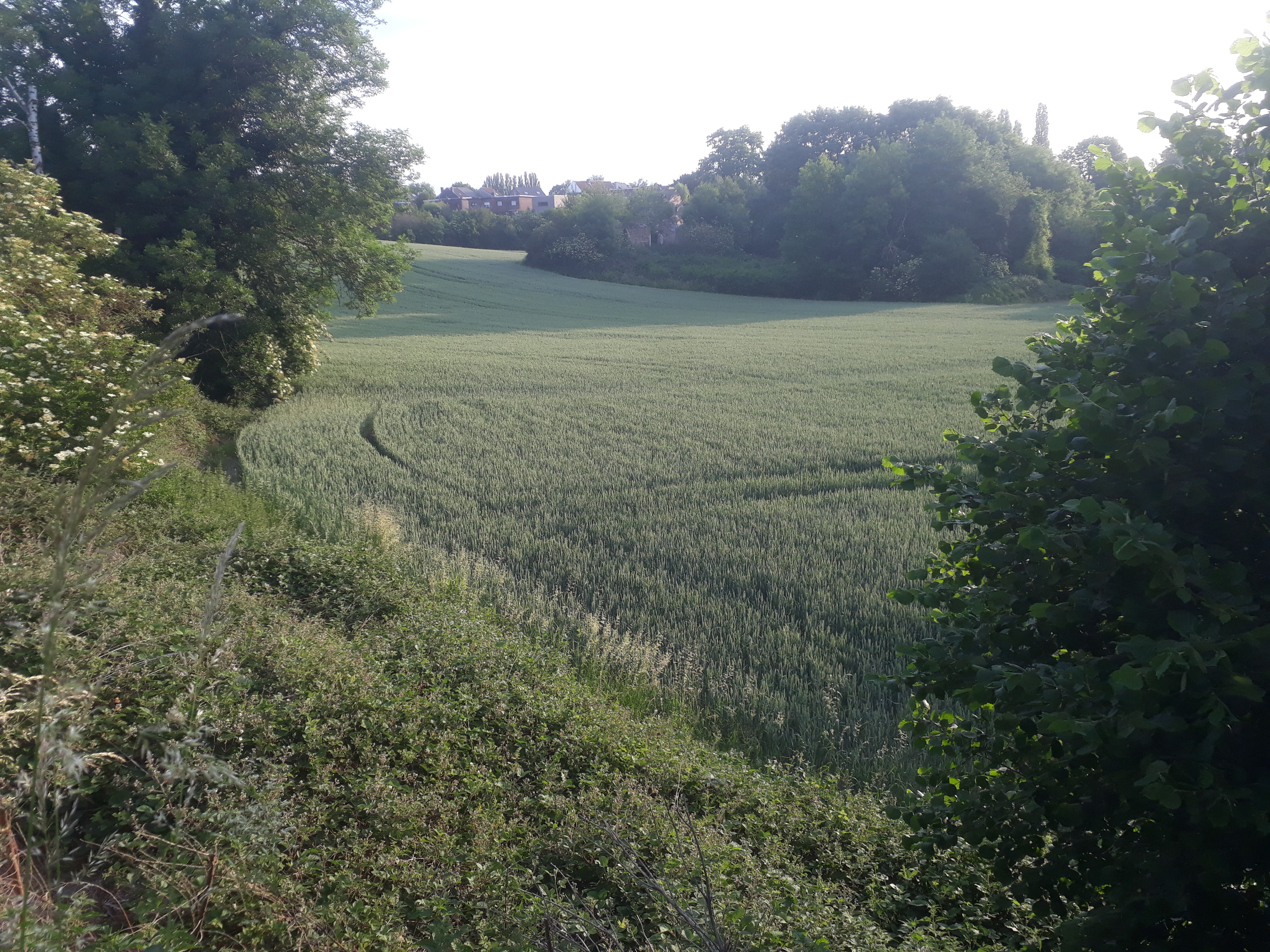
The underground Ruisseau du Bouxthay crosses this valley near the ruins of the castle of the same name

==== Exhaure de Milmort ====
This stream drains the lower part of Milmort; it is an intermittent stream. Since the construction of the Liège-Hasselt railroad, the water flows through the side drain of the rails.

=== Main river ===
The main river begins after the Rida receives the waters of Haren and the Exhaure de Milmort. At this location there are marshy lands on which the only two reed beds in the municipality of Herstal have been developed . There is a remarkable pollard willow with a 3 m circumference, which has not been pruned since at least the year 2000.

Downstream from the little bridge under the Liège-Tongeren railroad line near the Patar farm, there is still a wet meadow, but the water of the Rida is absorbed in a pipe that leads it to the Meuse. Here and there, traces of the Rida's course are still visible in the urban landscape.

The Rida is taken to a place called Bériwa (in Herstal ) (Etymology: "Beau Ruisseau" (in Walloon), according to the 1841 Atlas des Chemins Vicinaux).

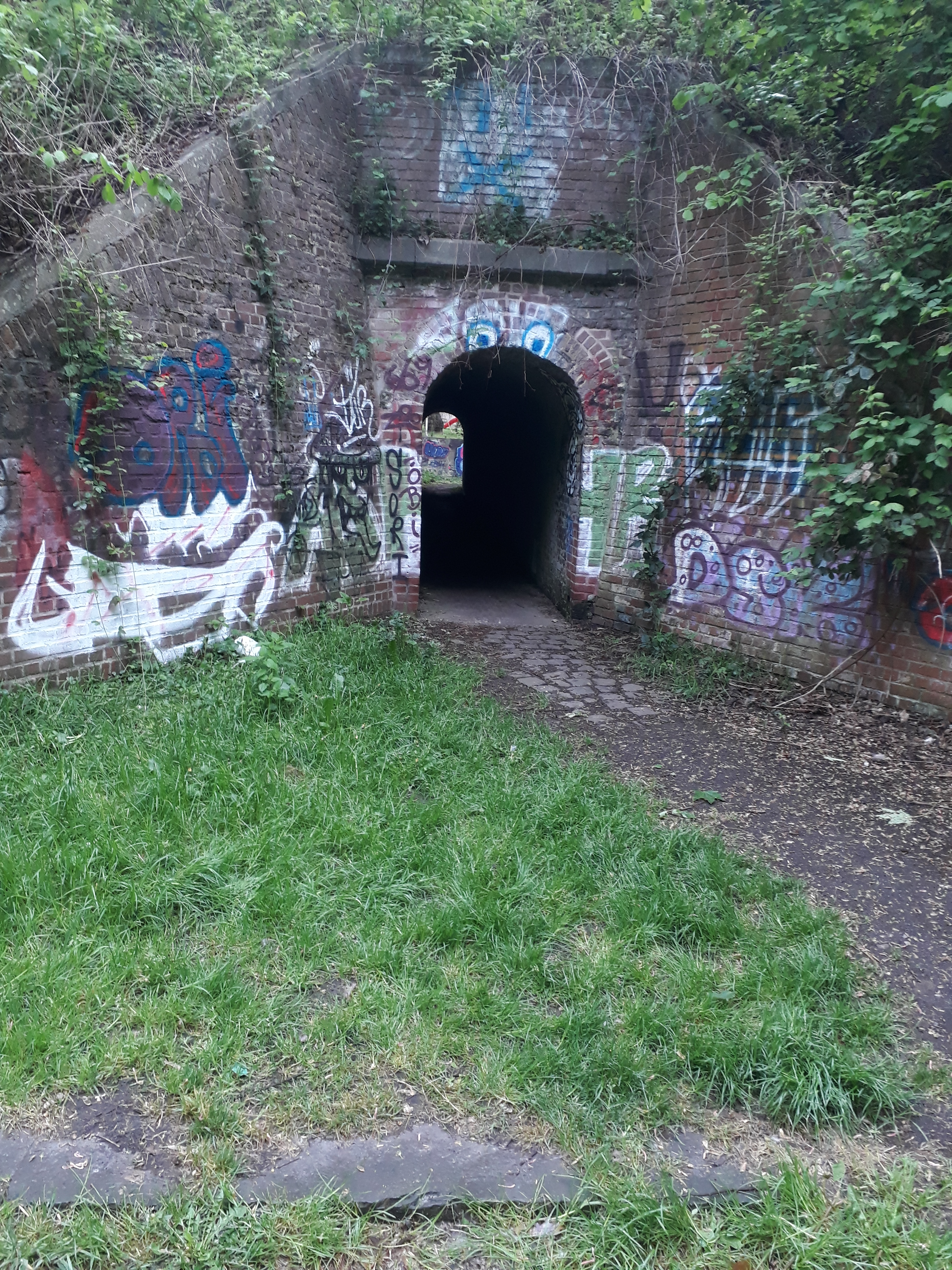
Bridge under the tracks of the Liège-Tongres railroad line through which the Rida runs underground, along with footpath No. 100. The edge in blue stone in the foreground marks the spot where the Rida reappeared; later it was incorporated into a pipe here.

=== Downriver ===
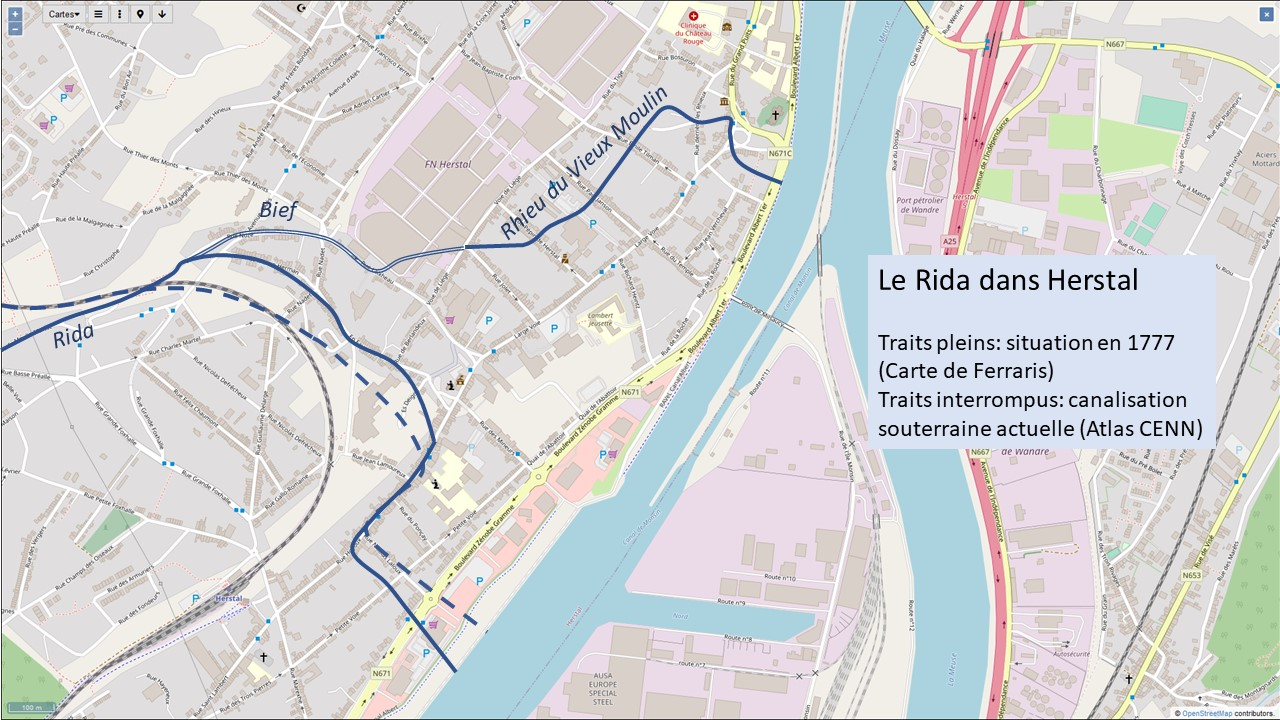
The Rida in Herstal

Downstream of Bériwa, after the Moulin Nozé, the Rida split into two. The main course was diverted through the current location of rue Laixheau and flowed toward Place Licour. During storms, part of the stream ran in its original course, via Rue Faurieux, where the vault of the passage under an old railroad line is still visible.

== History ==
Along the Rida were nine water mills. That is why the stream was once called "Rieu des Mollins." The original name of the Charlemagne farm was "Moulin du Rida."

The slopes of the Rida valley were used for growing vegetables, especially strawberries.

== Categorization ==
The Rida is included in the Atlas of Unnavigable Waterways. In this atlas, the part in Vottem is called the Ruisseau du Ponçay (third category) and the part in Herstal, Ruisseau du Patar (second category).

== River Management ==
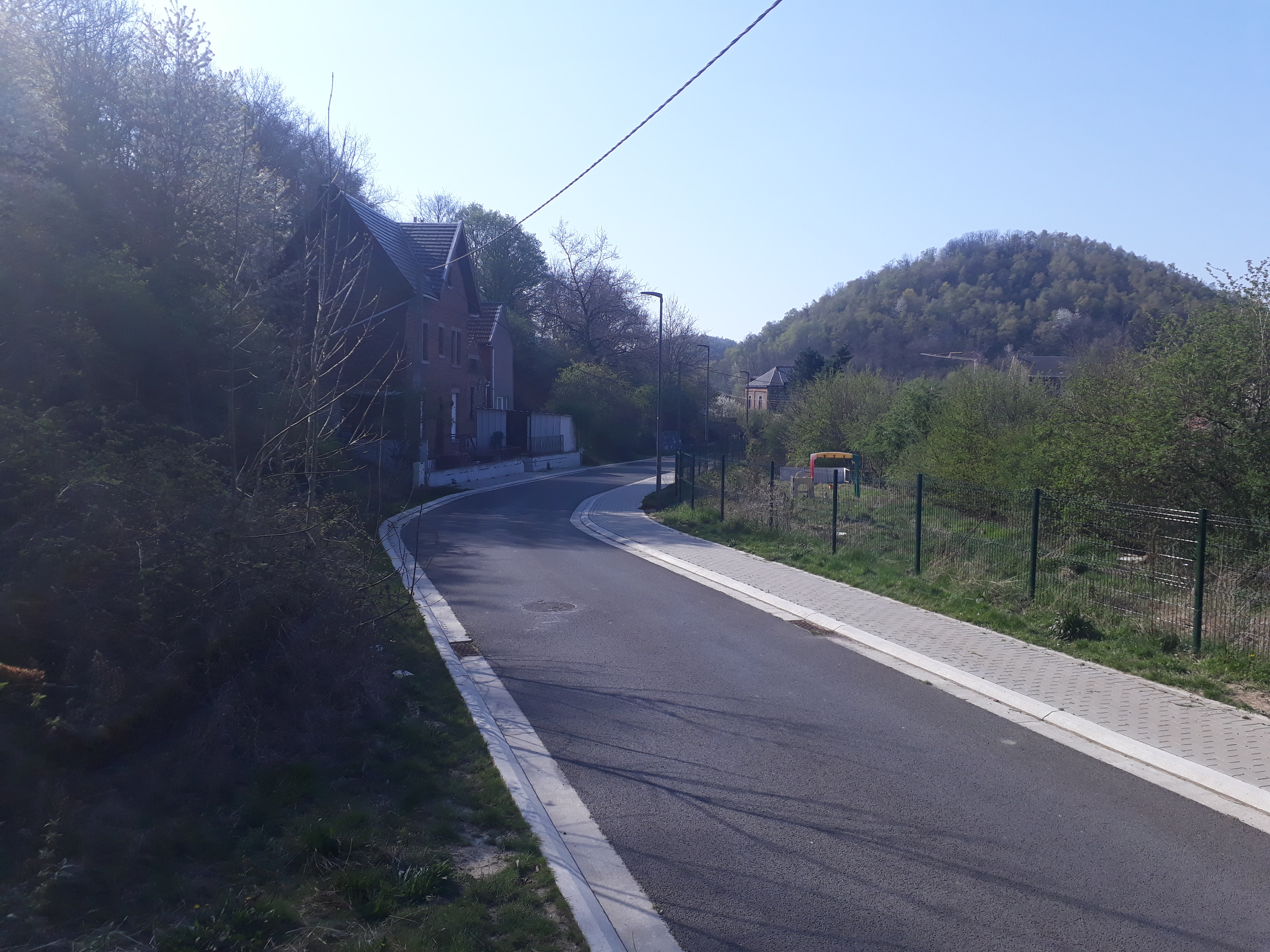
From Rue Bois Gilles, the Rida is incorporated into the sewer network of the city of Herstal

=== Pollution risks ===
Until the 1970s, there was an open landfill constructed in the valley head of the Rida Valley. This dump was abandoned and reforested, without any specific remediation measures. The Rida River passes under it via a pipe that exits at the foot of the old landfill. In April 2008, Dr. Migeotte, a resident of Vottem, had soil samples analyzed around this landfill at the Malvoz Institute laboratory in Liège. It concluded that the concentrations of cadmium, lead and genuine hydrocarbons posed a risk to human health and the environment. At the Herstal City Council in October 2008, Mayor Frédéric Daerden was questioned about this by all political groups. Council member Johan Vandepaer (PTB) expressed fears that both the surrounding soil and the waters of the Rida would be contaminated and asked the City Council to analyze samples in the laboratory. The mayor announced that he had contacted SPAQUE to conduct analyses and verifications at the site, and that he would inform the members of the City Council of the results.

The stream is not included in the DHI Maas surface water mass characterization sheets.

=== Upgrading ===
The 2013 municipal structure plan aims to upgrade the sections of the Rida that are still open and bring other sections back to the surface when it feasible to do so. However, the municipality is not part of the "Meuse Aval" river contract.

== Typonomy and branding ==
In a detailed survey of the toponymy of Vottem, recorded in archives dating back to the 13th century, the toponymy "Rida" appears most frequently. Originally, people wrote Rieu dauble, with the root auble attached to the Latin albus (white), i.e. "White Stream". In Vottem in particular, Rida has a positive connotation, passed down from generation to generation:

- In the late 1970s, early 1980s, the magazine of the schoolchildren of the Athénée Royal de Vottem (located along the brook) was called "Le Rida Enchaîné."
- The former name of Rue Florent Boclinville in Vottem was Rue du Rida.
- Legends circulate in Vottem about the Rida valley; witches came there and it is also mentioned that it used to be a frivolous meeting place where people came by horse and cart from Liège.

The names "Ruisseau du Ponçay" and "Ruisseau du Patar" that appear on certain administrative maps are not known in Vottem. Nor do one find these names in a list of Vottem's toponymy at the beginning of the 20th century.

== See also ==
- Meuse
