= Fedasil =

Belgian institution responsible for receiving asylum seekers

Fedasil (Federal Agency for the Reception of Asylum Seekers) is a Belgian institution that is responsible for the reception of asylum seekers. The organisation is further responsible for the observation and orientation of unaccompanied minor foreign nationals (UMFNs). The reception of asylum seekers is provided at individual reception locations or collective reception centres.

Since February 2025 Fedasil operates under the supervision of Anneleen Van Bossuyt serving as the Minister of Asylum, Migration, Integration and Urban policy in the De Wever government.

In accordance with the Reception Act of 12 January 2007, the agency provides material assistance: accommodation, food, clothing, medical, social and psychological counselling and access to legal support and certain services (interpreters, training).

For those wishing to return to their country of origin either during or after an asylum procedure, Fedasil will provide a programme for voluntary return. Fedasil is also authorised to perform resettlement.

Fedasil is led by Michael Kegels, the agency's Director-General. Fedasil was declared Federal Government Organisation of the Year in 2016.

== Mission and vision ==
Fedasil is responsible for the reception of asylum seekers and other target groups and guarantees high-quality and conformity within the various reception structures. Besides reception, Fedasil also coordinates voluntary return programmes.

The organisation describes its vision as follows: "Fedasil guarantees equal services, irrespective of implementation modalities, and integrated counselling attuned to the specific characteristics of the various target groups. The protection of personal integrity and the provision of a realistic image of the future are important points of attention in this regard.

Fedasil is said to strive to attain the requisite flexibility and decisiveness in order to be able to fully assume it's responsibility. The most important success factors for this are said to be : "Involvement in the preliminary phases and aftercare, a responsible organisation that puts result-oriented and efficient management at all levels first and foremost, combined with the necessary transparency and regular follow-up".

Fedasil intends to make an important contribution to the definition, correct image, social acceptance and implementation of a just migration policy. To this end, Fedasil intends to observe Belgium's international commitments, such as the conventions and treaties concerning human rights and European Directives with regard to reception and asylum.”

== History ==
Prior to 1986, there was no structured reception for asylum seekers in Belgium. The federal government considered the Public Social Welfare Centres responsible for this and paid for their support services. In 1986, Belgium saw a steep rise in the number of asylum requests, owing in part to conflicts in Eastern Europe, Iraq and Iran, Ethiopia and Eritrea, which were displacing great waves of refugees. The federal government therefore decided to set up collective reception locations. The first to open, in November 1986, was the ‘Petit Château’, a former military barracks in Brussels, but by the end of 1992, it was no longer able to accommodate the flow of refugees. A total of almost 27,000 asylum seekers arrived in Belgium in 1993, which led the federal government to open multiple centres across the country. Over the years, Fedasil has needed to expand or reduce its reception capacity depending on the number of asylum seekers on Belgian soil. In the years 1999 and 2000, for example, Belgium saw a steep rise in the number of asylum requests. The year 2000, which also saw the one-off regularisation campaign, broke all records with 42,691 requests.

The years that followed saw the number of asylum requests in Belgium drop back, however, only beginning to rise again from 2014 onwards. The reasons for this were largely related to the conflicts in Afghanistan and Iraq, and the Syrian civil war. In 2015, Fedasil only had a few months to double its number of reception locations in order to accommodate 35,000 people. It worked together with a whole range of existing partners – including the Red Cross, Caritas and Samu Social – in order to achieve this.

The number of asylum requests dropped back once more at the start of 2016, which led to a number of these temporary centres closing their doors again. By the end of 2016, Fedasil will be operating 25,000 structural reception places along with a number of buffer places for the reception of asylum seekers.

== Size ==
Fedasil employs over 1,500 staff as of mid-2016, spread across twenty reception centres, the head office, the Dispatching service and its regional offices. Fedasil has two reception regions (North and South) that span the various reception structures, and a range of partners (local reception initiatives, the Red Cross, the Flanders Refugee Council, private entities etc.).

== Reception ==
Anyone requesting asylum in Belgium will be referred to Fedasil's Dispatching service, which will allocate the asylum seeker a place, usually in a Fedasil reception centre or with a partner organisation (such as the Red Cross). The allocation will consider the number of places available and the asylum seeker's particular situation (family composition, knowledge of local languages, the age of their children, state of health).

Particular attention is paid to 'vulnerable' persons, for example unaccompanied foreign minors, single parents, disabled persons, the elderly, pregnant women and victims of human trafficking, torture or other forms of violence. These asylum seekers will be referred to more structured reception or an institution where more tailored guidance can be provided.

Reception centres will house people with a wide range of ages, religions and nationalities. All reception locations are neutral or, in other words, everybody's ideological and religious opinions are respected. Specific accommodation is reserved for families. Asylum seekers have the right to social guidance. They will be allocated a social worker on arrival, who will support them during the course of their stay at the centre and throughout the asylum procedure. Asylum seekers at a reception centre can also call upon the services of interpreters, psychologists and medics.

== Europe ==
Fedasil works actively with a number of European exchange platforms seeking to address the reception of asylum seekers, voluntary return and re-integration into their countries of origin. Over the past few years, Fedasil has also been involved in ENARO exchanges within Europe. Furthermore, Fedasil regularly sends experts abroad as part of EASO missions (to Greece, for example). International activities (missions, resettlement, voluntary return, re-integration etc.) are financed by the European Asylum, Migration and Integration Fund.

== Poetry ==
On the Move: Poems and Songs of Migration is a book of poetry written by people living at the Fedasil Petit-Chateau Arrival Centre, with Marieke Slovin Lewis and S.R. Harris.
