= Oasis (Minecraft clone) =

Playable AI-generated Minecraft clone

- Gameplay from the official release trailer
- Developers: Robert Wachen; Dean Leitersdorf
- Publishers: Decart; Etched
- Series: Minecraft (unofficial)
- Release: October 31, 2024; 2 years ago
- Genre: Sandbox

Oasis is a 2024 video game that attempts to replicate the 2011 sandbox game Minecraft, run entirely using generative artificial intelligence. The project, which began development in 2022 between the AI company Decart and the computer hardware startup Etched, was released by Decart to the public on October 31, 2024.

The AI-driven simulation uses "next-frame prediction" to anticipate player actions based on keyboard and mouse inputs, trained on millions of hours of gameplay footage. Without memory or code, the game often outputs unpredictable changes in scenery and inventory, limiting its functionality as a traditional video game. Critics noted its lack of sound, low frame rate, and "dream-like" appearance, though some praised its unpredictability as entertaining. The project is seen as a potential proof of concept for AI-driven video games.

== Creation and gameplay ==
The demo "proof of concept" version of the game was developed by Israeli San Francisco–based AI company Decart and Silicon Valley hardware startup Etched. The idea originated in 2022 when Robert Wachen, a Harvard graduate and co-founder of Etched, met Dean Leitersdorf, an Israel Institute of Technology graduate and co-founder of Decart. Sharing an interest in OpenAI's GPT-3, they collaborated to create the game, naming it after the setting of the novel and film Ready Player One. It was funded by a $21 million grant from Israeli-American billionaire Oren Zeev and New York–based Sequoia Capital.

Decart released the game to the public for free on October 31, 2024. The AI replicates Minecraft's gameplay without code using "next-frame prediction", in which the AI tries to predict what the player will see after each keyboard and mouse input, which it was trained to do on millions of hours of Minecraft footage.

The game used Nvidia graphics processing units or GPUs for its demo but plans to transition to more energy-efficient Sohu GPUs, under development by Etched, capable of supporting up to 4K graphics. Etched has also suggested the possibility of making the game open source in the future. Alongside Oasis, the company is co-developing AI-generated video and educational content.

== Reception ==
Upon its launch, many players posted videos of their experience with the game online, which often showed Oasis could not maintain coherent logic in its actions or setting. The game also presented low-quality graphics, running between 360p and 720p consistently at 20 FPS, no in-game sound, and could only be played for five minutes at a time before restarting. These issues led some news outlets to refer to the game as a "nightmarish hallucination", and drawing comparisons to dementia and dreams. Despite the negative reviews, Leitersdorf, as well as a number of commentators, have commented that while the game may have fallen short of replicating Minecraft in its demo launch, it was the first step towards something more advanced, which could one day resemble Minecraft or any other game. Online publication The Backdash commented the game could be a "glimpse at the future of game development", while others like Tom's Hardware expressed doubts a game without code could ever look as good as one with, arguing they fail to capture "the point of what makes games fun—or even coherent".

In terms of legality, Decart and Etched did not receive permission from Microsoft to create a copy of their game using generative artificial intelligence. No legal actions have been taken by the latter, however, as artificial intelligence and copyright remains largely vague legally.

== See also ==
- ai_sponge
- Genie (world model)
- Nothing, Forever
- TrumporBiden2024
