= Bezos Expeditions =

Family office for Jeff Bezos

- Company type: Private
- Industry: Family office
- Founded: 2005; 21 years ago
- Founders: Jeff Bezos
- Headquarters: Mercer Island; Washington, U.S.
- Products: Investments
- AUM: US$107.8 billion (2020)
- Website: bezosexpeditions.com

Bezos Expeditions is an American investment firm based in Mercer Island, Washington. It serves as a family office for Amazon.com founder Jeff Bezos by managing his personal investments. The firm invests both in early and late stage ventures of companies in different sectors.

== Background ==
Bezos Expeditions was founded in 2005 by Jeff Bezos as an investment vehicle to manage his personal investments. The firm has a dedicated team responsible for handling all processes related to investments. The firm has made numerous high-profile investments such as Twitter, Airbnb, Uber, Perplexity AI, Stack Overflow, General Assembly, Workday and Business Insider.

Aside from for-profit ventures, the firm also supports funding philanthropic efforts. Examples include an Innovation center at the Seattle Museum of History and Industry and the Bezos Center for Neural Circuit Dynamics at Princeton Neuroscience Institute. In 2013, Bezos Expeditions funded the recovery of two Saturn V first-stage Rocketdyne F-1 engines from the floor of the Atlantic Ocean. They were positively identified as belonging to the Apollo 11 mission's S-1C stage from July 1969. The engines are on display at the Seattle Museum of Flight.

Bezos Expeditions has funded the Clock of the Long Now also called the 10,000-year clock. It was funded with $42 million, and is on land which Bezos owns in Texas.

== Notable investments ==
- Advanced Machine Intelligence Labs
- Airbnb
- Basecamp
- Blue Origin
- Business Insider
- Clock of the Long Now
- Convoy
- Domo
- D-Wave Systems
- Fundbox
- General Assembly
- General Fusion
- Glassybaby
- GRAIL
- Juno Therapeutics
- MakerBot
- Nextdoor
- NotCo
- Overtime
- Pioneer Square Labs
- Rescale
- Sonder Corp.
- Stack Overflow
- Synchron
- The Washington Post
- Twitter
- Uber
- Unity Biotechnology
- Vicarious
- Wildtype
- Workday
- Zocdoc
