= TrumporBiden2024 =

Political humor Twitch channel

Twitch information
- Channel: trumporbiden2024
- Followers: 89.4K

TrumporBiden2024 was a Twitch channel that featured artificial intelligence (AI) versions of then former U.S. president Donald Trump and then president Joe Biden engaging in an endless, profane, comedic political debate. After launching, the channel gained the attention of news media. The channel was presented as satire.

== Content ==
The AI versions of Trump and Biden spoke in alternation with each other, insulting each other with profane language while weaving in real-life political talking points, insults, and topics associated with their respective political careers. Additionally, the AI versions of both men responded to comments made by members of the Twitch-chat, frequently insulting them.

The vocabulary data set the AI for both Biden and Trump pulls from included references to various pop culture items such as Pokémon or anime. The AI Trump made remarks about sports teams, such as the Toronto Maple Leafs. The AI Biden frequently referred to the fictional meme alter-ego Dark Brandon. The mannerisms of both AI versions were largely the same as the real versions of both men.

== Creation ==
The channel was created by The Singularity Group, a company associated with Belgian online gaming personality Athene.

=== Technology ===
The character voices and video were generated in real-time, using large language models and deepfake technology, although the exact methods applied are unclear.

== Reception ==
The TrumporBiden2024 channel garnered international media commentary regarding for its continuous stream showcasing the AI replicas. The channel was described as "unhinged" and "a good way to ready yourself for the likely circus that will accompany the next presidential election".

== See also ==
- ai_sponge, 2023 AI-generated livestreams
- Artificial intelligence and elections
- Nothing, Forever
- Twitch Plays Pokémon
