= Clement Farabet =

French-American computer scientist

Clément Farabet
- Education: Université Paris-Est (Ph.D., 2010)
- Scientific career
- Fields: Artificial Intelligence; Natural Language Processing & Understanding; Deep Learning
- Workplaces: New York University; Google DeepMind
- Doctoral advisor: Laurent Najman, Yann LeCun
- Other academic advisors: Yann LeCun
- Website: clmt.ai

Clément Farabet is a computer scientist and AI expert known for his contributions to the field of deep learning. He served as a research scientist at the New York University. He serves as the Vice President of Research at Google DeepMind and previously served as the VP of AI Infrastructure at NVIDIA.

His scholarly work received over 11,000 citations with an h-index of 21.

== Education ==
In 2008, Farabet earned a master's degree in electrical engineering with honors from Institut national des sciences appliquées (INSA) de Lyon, France.

In 2013, Farabet received his PhD at Université Paris-Est, co-advised by Professors Laurent Najman and Yann LeCun. His thesis focused on real-time image understanding and introduced multi-scale convolutional networks and graph-based techniques for efficient segmentations of class prediction maps.

== Career ==
In 2008, after completing his Master's degree, Farabet joined Professor Yann LeCun's laboratory at the Courant Institute of Mathematical Sciences at New York University. His Master's thesis work on reconfigurable hardware for deep neural networks resulted in a patent. He continued his collaboration with Yann LeCun, and in 2009, he began working with Yale University's e-Lab, led by Eugenio Culurciello. This collaboration eventually led to the creation of TeraDeep.

He began his career as a researcher, contributing to the development of LuaTorch, one of the first AI frameworks, which later evolved into PyTorch, widely recognized and adopted globally.

== Startups ==
Farabet co-founded MadBits, a startup with a focus on web-scale image understanding. The company was acquired by Twitter in 2014.

Following this acquisition, Farabet co-founded Twitter Cortex, a team dedicated to building Twitter's deep learning platform for various applications, including recommendations, search, spam detection, and NSFW content and ads.

== Publications ==
- Farabet, Clement; Couprie, Camille; Najman, Laurent; LeCun, Yann (August 2013). "Learning Hierarchical Features for Scene Labeling". IEEE Transactions on Pattern Analysis and Machine Intelligence. 35 (8): 1915–1929. Bibcode:2013ITPAM..35.1915F. doi:10.1109/TPAMI.2012.231. PMID 23787344. S2CID 206765110.
- LeCun, Yann; Kavukcuoglu, Koray; Farabet, Clement (2010). "Convolutional networks and applications in vision". Proceedings of 2010 IEEE International Symposium on Circuits and Systems. pp. 253–256. doi:10.1109/ISCAS.2010.5537907. ISBN 978-1-4244-5308-5. S2CID 7625356.
- Collobert, Ronan; Kavukcuoglu, K.; Farabet, C. (2011). "Torch7: A Matlab-like Environment for Machine Learning". Neural Information Processing Systems.
- Couprie, Camille; Farabet, Clément; Najman, Laurent; LeCun, Yann (16 January 2013). "Indoor Semantic Segmentation using depth information". arXiv:1301.3572 [cs.CV].
- Farabet, Clement (2011). "NeuFlow: A runtime reconfigurable dataflow processor for vision". CVPR 2011 Workshops. pp. 109–116. doi:10.1109/CVPRW.2011.5981829. ISBN 978-1-4577-0529-8. S2CID 851574.
- Farabet, Clement (2009). "CNP: An FPGA-based processor for Convolutional Networks". 2009 International Conference on Field Programmable Logic and Applications. pp. 32–37. doi:10.1109/FPL.2009.5272559. S2CID 5339694.
- Farabet, Clement (2010). "Hardware accelerated convolutional neural networks for synthetic vision systems". Proceedings of 2010 IEEE International Symposium on Circuits and Systems. pp. 257–260. doi:10.1109/ISCAS.2010.5537908. ISBN 978-1-4244-5308-5. S2CID 6542026.
