= NEE =

Belgian political protest group

- Leader: Jan De Bruyn
- Spokesperson: Bachir Boumaaza
- Founded: 2005
- Headquarters: Eggestraat 39; 2060 Antwerp
- Ideology: Political satire Political protest Populism

Website
- (archived link)

NEE (Dutch for no) is a political protest group whose goal was to provide an alternative for voters who are unhappy with all political parties at hand in Belgium, where voting is compulsory.

The NEE party was founded in 2005 in Antwerp. The idea of the protest party was started by a group of young people, who felt that their local community had lost confidence in the Belgian politicians and their intentions. NEE first participated in the municipal elections of 2006 and ran for a second time in the 2007 Belgian general election.

The members of the NEE group went in a non-political direction after the 2007 elections, working on a movie project, and a fictional suicide blog, among other activities. It is unclear if a return to political activity is planned.

== Platform ==
Originally the party stated that elected NEE members would occupy their seat and vote against every proposition made. This strategy was changed and subsequently claimed that elected members would not fill an active role, instead leaving seats empty as a 'none of the above' option to allow dissatisfied voters a chance to sanction the other parties, which - in Belgium - are financially rewarded for every seat they obtain in parliament. Empty seats would also be a more realistic representation of the voter's opinion, considering that the voter did not want to support any actual politician.

The party organises its campaigns mainly through the internet. Besides an internet campaign, small scaled, sometimes satirical actions are organised in NEE's hometown, Antwerp.

== 2007 election campaign ==
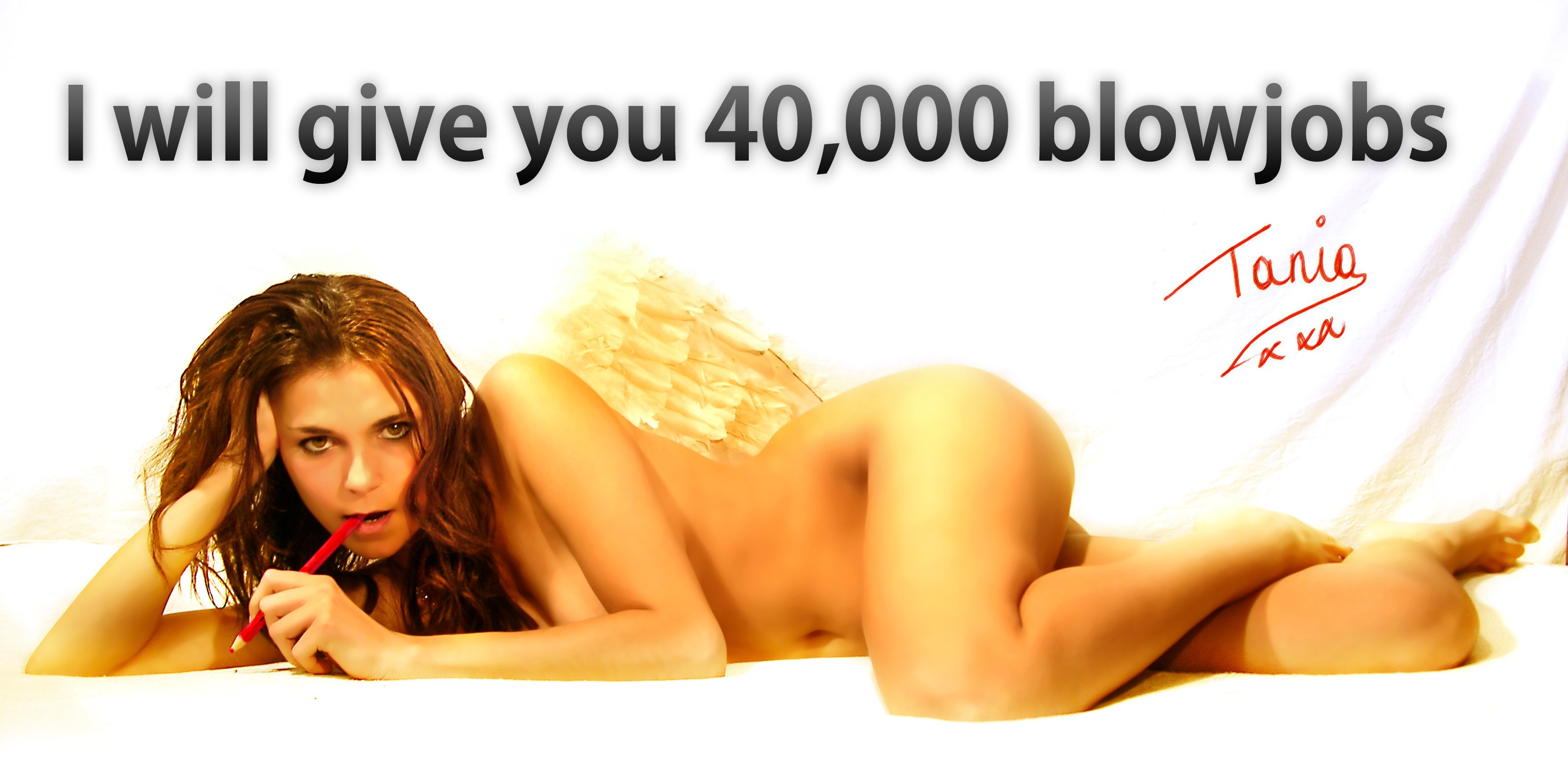
Tania Derveaux, blowjob campaign advertisement

NEE attracted international attention when its lead candidate for the Senate in the 2007 Belgian general election, Tania Derveaux, posed naked in an ad that promised to create 400,000 jobs. The ad was intended as a parodic attack on other parties that made claims about job creation that NEE considered ridiculous. According to the NEE website, she received back requests which were not for jobs, but for blowjobs. In response, NEE posted advertisements and a form on its website offering the opportunity to subscribe for one of the 40,000 blowjobs Tania would offer.

Eventually the promised blowjobs were given out virtually, by posting a (now unavailable) video clip on YouTube. An actress, Lin Chong, entitled as Tania's blowjob assistant, made gestures in the video as if she was performing oral sex on the viewer.

== Election results ==
In the municipal elections of 2006, the party received 1.51% of the votes for the Antwerp city council, but no candidate was elected.

In the general elections of 2007, NEE scored 0.18% for the Senate, which was not enough to obtain a seat.

== See also ==
- Belgian Federal Parliament
- Politics of Belgium
- Political parties in Belgium
