= Yann LeCun =

French computer scientist (born 1960)

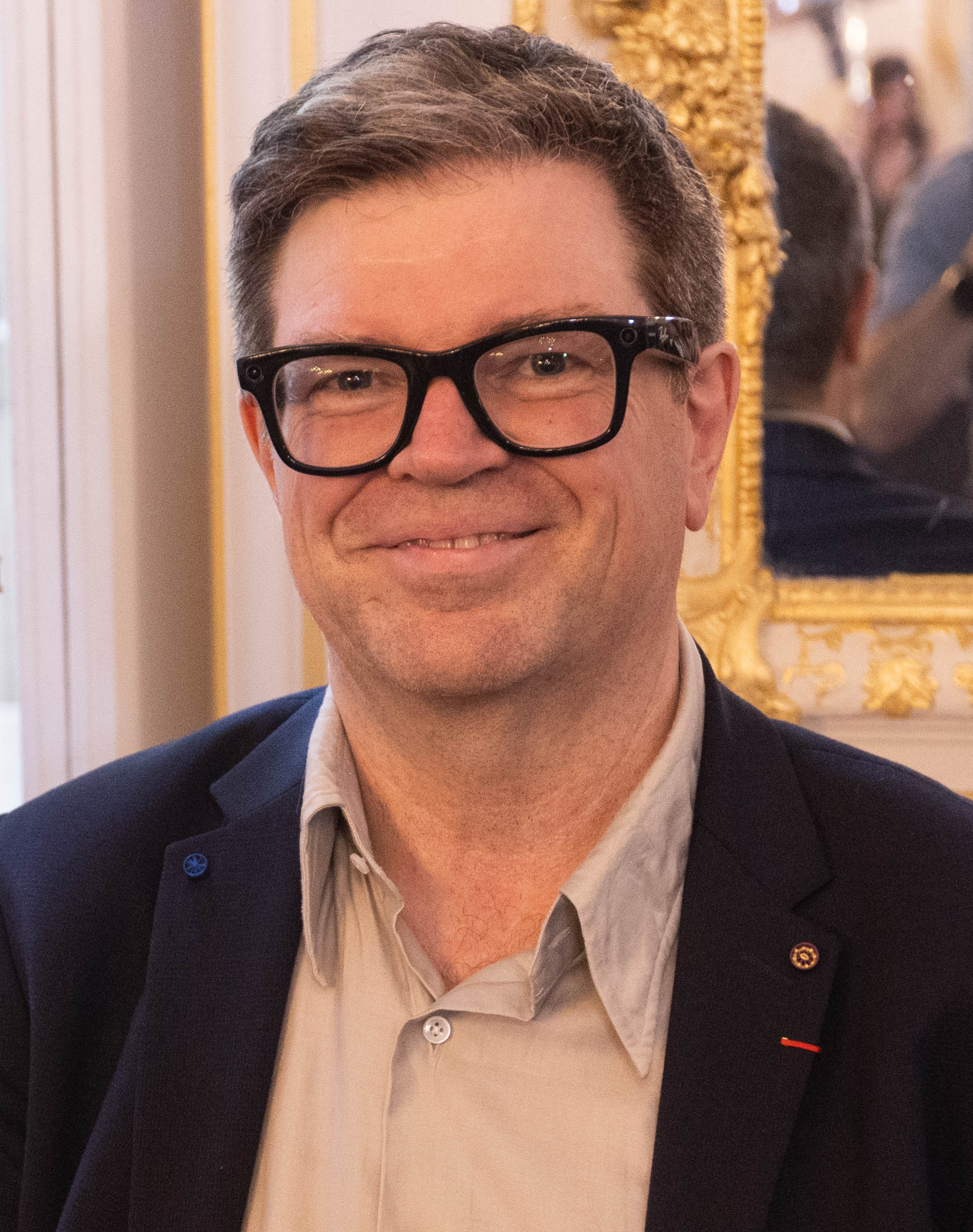
- LeCun in 2024
- Born: Yann André Le Cun; 8 July 1960 (age 66); Soisy-sous-Montmorency, France
- Citizenship: United States; France
- Education: ESIEE Paris (DipIng); Pierre and Marie Curie University (PhD)
- Known for: Deep learning
- Children: 3
- Awards: Turing Award (2018); AAAI Fellow (2019); Member of the National Academy of Sciences (2021); Legion of Honour (2023); VinFuture Prize (2024); Queen Elizabeth Prize for Engineering (2025)
- Scientific career
- Fields: Artificial intelligence; Machine learning; Computer vision; Robotics; Image compression
- Workplaces: Bell Labs (1988–1996); Meta Platforms (2013–2025); Advanced Machine Intelligence Labs (2025–present)
- Thesis: Modeles connexionnistes de l'apprentissage (connectionist learning models) (1987)
- Doctoral advisor: Maurice Milgram

Yann André Le Cun (/ləˈkʌn/ lə-KUN; French: [ləkœ̃]; usually spelled LeCun; born 8 July 1960) is a French-American computer scientist working in the fields of artificial intelligence, machine learning, computer vision, robotics and image compression. He is the Jacob T. Schwartz Professor of Computer Science at the Courant Institute of Mathematical Sciences at New York University (NYU). He served as Chief AI Scientist at Meta Platforms before co-founding Advanced Machine Intelligence Labs in December 2025.

LeCun completed a computer science PhD at the Université Pierre et Marie Curie in 1987, and was briefly a postdoctoral researcher under Geoffrey Hinton at the University of Toronto. From 1988, LeCun led the development of the LeNet convolutional neural networks for optical character recognition at Bell Labs. He is one of the main creators of the DjVu image compression technology, alongside Léon Bottou and Patrick Haffner. In 2003, LeCun joined NYU, where he worked on energy-based models, computer vision, and DARPA autonomous navigation projects.

In 2013, LeCun joined Facebook Artificial Intelligence Research. In 2018, LeCun, Yoshua Bengio, and Geoffrey Hinton received the Turing Award from the Association for Computing Machinery for their work on deep learning. LeCun, Bengio, and Hinton are sometimes referred to as the "Godfathers of AI" and "Godfathers of Deep Learning".

== Early life and education ==
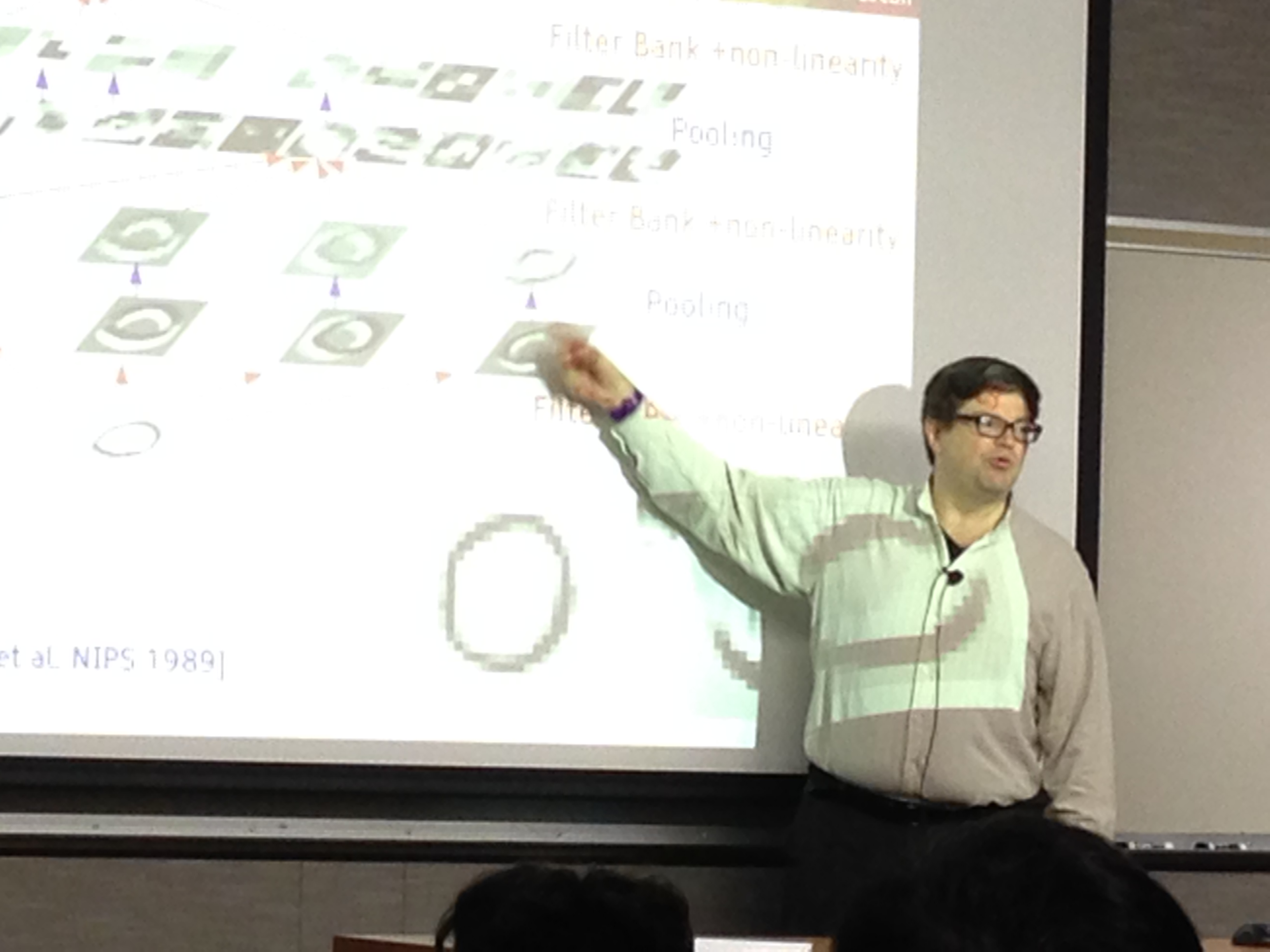
LeCun at the University of Minnesota, 2014

Yann André Le Cun was born on 8 July 1960 at Soisy-sous-Montmorency, in the suburbs of Paris. His surname, Le Cun, derives from the old Breton form Le Cunff and originates from the region of Guingamp in northern Brittany. Yann is the Breton form of Jean, the French form of John.

He received a Diplôme d'Ingénieur from the ESIEE Paris in 1983 and a PhD in computer science from Université Pierre et Marie Curie (now Sorbonne University) in 1987, during which he proposed an early form of backpropagation, an algorithm crucial for enabling neural networks to learn. Before joining AT&T, LeCun was a postdoctoral researcher for a year, starting in 1987, supervised by Geoffrey Hinton at the University of Toronto.

LeCun has three sons, and his brother is employed by Google. He has American citizenship.

== Career and research ==
LeCun's career has been spent primarily at Bell Labs, New York University and Meta Platforms, Inc.

=== Bell Labs ===
In 1988, LeCun joined the Adaptive Systems Research Department at AT&T Bell Laboratories in Holmdel, New Jersey, United States, headed by Lawrence D. Jackel, where he developed a number of new machine learning methods, such as a biologically inspired model of image recognition called convolutional neural networks (LeNet), the "Optimal Brain Damage" regularization methods, and the Graph Transformer Networks method (similar to conditional random field), which he applied to optical character recognition (OCR) for printed and handwritten text. The bank check recognition system that he helped develop was widely deployed by NCR and other companies.

In 1996, he joined AT&T Labs-Research as head of the Image Processing Research Department, which was part of Lawrence Rabiner's Speech and Image Processing Research Lab, and worked primarily on the DjVu image compression technology, a format designed for efficient distribution of scanned documents, and used by the Internet Archive to provide access to digitized texts. His collaborators at AT&T include Léon Bottou and Vladimir Vapnik.

=== New York University ===
After a brief tenure as a fellow of NEC Research Institute, LeCun joined New York University in 2003, where he is Jacob T. Schwartz Chaired Professor of Computer Science and Neural Science at the Courant Institute of Mathematical Sciences and the Center for Neural Science. At NYU, he has worked primarily on energy-based models for supervised and unsupervised learning, feature learning for object recognition in computer vision, and mobile robotics.

In 2012, he became the founding director of the NYU Center for Data Science. On 9 December 2013, LeCun became the first director of Meta AI Research in New York City and in early 2014 stepped down from the NYU–CDS directorship.

In 2013, he and Yoshua Bengio co-founded the International Conference on Learning Representations, which adopted a post-publication open review process he previously advocated on his website. He was the chair and organiser of the "Learning Workshop" held every year between 1986 and 2012 in Snowbird, Utah. He is a member of the Science Advisory Board of the Institute for Pure and Applied Mathematics at UCLA. He is the co-director of the Learning in Machines and Brain research program (formerly Neural Computation & Adaptive Perception) of CIFAR.

In 2016, he was the visiting professor of computer science on the Chaire Annuelle Informatique et Sciences Numériques at Collège de France in Paris, where he presented the leçon inaugurale (inaugural lecture). In 2023, he was named as the inaugural Jacob T. Schwartz Chaired Professor in Computer Science at NYU's Courant Institute. LeCun is also a scientific advisor to French research group Kyutai which is being funded by Xavier Niel, Rodolphe Saadé, Eric Schmidt, and others.

=== Meta Platforms ===
LeCun joined Facebook (now Meta Platforms) in 2013 as chief AI scientist and led the company's AI research laboratory, FAIR.

=== AMI Labs ===
On 19 November 2025, LeCun confirmed that he would be leaving Meta after ten years to found his own company focused on world-model architectures and human-like artificial intelligence he calls superintelligence.

The company he founded, Advanced Machine Intelligence Labs (or AMI Labs), is run by CEO Alex LeBrun, with LeCun serving as Executive Chair. This venture is focused on building AI "world models": systems that learn to understand the physical world's structure and dynamics rather than just predict text like large language models.

In March 2026, AMI announced it had raised $1.03 billion in funding at a $3.5 billion pre-money valuation. The funding round was co-led by investors including Cathay Innovation, Greycroft, Hiro Capital, HV Capital and Bezos Expeditions.

In January 2026, LeCun became founding chair of the Technical Research Board of Logical Intelligence, an AI company developing energy-based (EBM) reasoning systems.

== Honours and awards ==
LeCun is a member of the US National Academy of Sciences, National Academy of Engineering and the French Académie des Sciences.

He has received honorary doctorates from Instituto Politécnico Nacional (IPN) in Mexico City in 2016, from EPFL in 2018, from Université Côte d'Azur in 2021, from Università di Siena in 2023, and from Hong Kong University of Science and Technology in 2023.

In 2014, he received the IEEE Neural Network Pioneer Award and in 2015, the PAMI Distinguished Researcher Award.

In 2018, LeCun was awarded the IRI Medal, established by the Industrial Research Institute (IRI), and the Harold Pender Award, given by the University of Pennsylvania.

In 2019, he received the Golden Plate Award of the American Academy of Achievement.

In March 2019, LeCun won the 2018 Turing Award, sharing it with Yoshua Bengio and Geoffrey Hinton.

In 2022, he received the Princess of Asturias Award in the category "Scientific Research", along with Yoshua Bengio, Geoffrey Hinton and Demis Hassabis.

In 2023, the President of France made him a Chevalier (Knight) of the French Legion of Honour.

During the World Economic Forum (WEF) 2024 in Davos, he received the Global Swiss AI Award 2023. The same year, he received the grand prize of the VinFuture Prize alongside Yoshua Bengio, Jensen Huang, Geoffrey Hinton, and Fei-Fei Li for their groundbreaking contributions to neural networks and deep learning algorithms.

In 2025, he was awarded the Queen Elizabeth Prize for Engineering jointly with Yoshua Bengio, Bill Dally, Geoffrey E. Hinton, John Hopfield, Jensen Huang and Fei-Fei Li.
