= Advanced Machine Intelligence Labs =

Paris-based AI startup

Advanced Machine Intelligence SASU
- Type: Private
- Industry: Artificial intelligence
- Founded: December 15, 2025; 11 months ago in Paris, France
- Founder: Yann LeCun
- Headquarters: Paris
- Key people: Yann LeCun (Executive chairman); Alexandre LeBrun (CEO); Laurent Solly (COO); Saining Xie (CSO); Pascale Fung (Chief Research and Innovation Officer); Mike Rabbat (VP World Models)

Advanced Machine Intelligence Labs (AMI Labs) is a Paris-based artificial intelligence research laboratory co-founded by Yann LeCun, the former Chief AI Scientist at Meta Platforms, in December 2025. It focuses on developing world model AI systems which understand the physical world, maintain long-term memory, and strategize complicated tasks, ensuring they remain secure and easily manageable. It raised $1.03 billion in a seed funding round from Bezos Expeditions, Nvidia, and Samsung Electronics, among others.

The company has locations in Paris, New York City, Montreal, and Singapore.

== Background ==
LeCun left Meta in November 2025, arguing that Meta and other leading AI companies would eventually reach a dead end with their single-minded focus on large language models (LLMs) and set out to build a new company centered on developing a more comprehensive world model for intelligent machines. AMI is intended to remain a research organisation not expected to produce a saleable product for around five years.

AMI Labs initially plans to develop its world models together with companies from data-intensive industries, such as manufacturing, biomedicine, or robotics. Its first official partner is the French startup Nabla, also led by Alexandre LeBrun, which develops AI software for doctors that automatically documents patient conversations and creates medical notes.

== Funding ==
In March 2026, AMI Labs announced a $1.03 billion seed funding round led by Bezos expeditions, Cathay Innovation, Greycroft, Hiro Capital, and HV Capital. According to Crunchbase News, it was the largest seed funding round for a European startup at the time.

== Research and partnerships ==
AMI Labs aims to develop world models, which are artificial intelligence systems intended to represent the physical world and support memory, reasoning, and planning. The company plans to develop these systems with partners in data driven industries, including manufacturing, biomedicine, and robotics.

Their first announced partner is Nabla, a company that develops software for documenting medical consultations. The partnership forms part of AMI Lab's plans to explore applications of its research. In March 2026, the company's approach remained at the research stage, with commercial applications expected to require further development.

== Competition ==
AMI Labs is not the only research laboratory working on this approach; the US company World Labs is also working on this field in the United States, Google DeepMind, OpenAI and Meta have also been working on this approach for many years.
