= Ai sponge =

2023 AI-generated livestreams

ai_sponge
- An artificially generated conversation between SpongeBob and Patrick
- Also known as: AI SpongeBob
- Inspired by: SpongeBob SquarePants
- Original language: English

Original release
- Network: Twitch; YouTube
- Release: 5 March 2023

ai_sponge, also referred to as "AI SpongeBob", was a pair of Twitch and YouTube channels parodying the American animated series SpongeBob SquarePants. The channels, which were designed with the intention to run indefinitely as a livestream, used artificially generated movements, voices, and dialogue exchanges of characters to run, influenced partly by unrestricted recommendations from an online chat. As a result, strange dialogue, especially those referring to sexual topics, became common on the channels, warranting them to be banned on a number of occasions for violating their streaming platform's terms of service. The original channel has since been listed as "unavailable" on Twitch, and has been taken down on YouTube.

While it was active, the channels brought into question how close AI can get to its source material before being considered copyright infringement, as well as the implications of using AI to automate entertainment, an issue which led to the 2023 SAG-AFTRA strike.

== History ==
ai_sponge was created on 5 March 2023, as a parody channel of the American animated series SpongeBob SquarePants. The format of the channel was reportedly similar to Nothing, Forever, a parody of the 1990s American sitcom Seinfeld, which began in December 2022 and used artificial intelligence (AI) to run. Streaming on the platform Twitch, the channel recreated characters and settings from the series using 3D modeling from the 2003 SpongeBob SquarePants video game Battle for Bikini Bottom. These characters and their movements, voices, and dialogue exchanges were all operated using AI. The AI was run using unspecified programs, and the owner of the channel did not make themselves public. Furthermore, the owner of the channel had no control of what dialogue the characters participated in, with dialogue instead being influenced by unrestricted recommendations from an online chat on the instant messaging app Discord. This led to the channel, which otherwise advertised itself as being rated PG-13, becoming largely known for its strange dialogue: with characters repeatedly discussing sexual situations, depression, drug misuse, kleptomania, communism, and tax fraud. This led to the channel being briefly taken down within the first 48 hours of going live due to a terms of service violation on Twitch.

The channel soon returned to operation, with the addition of also livestreaming on YouTube. Despite the odd dialogue, the channel's popularity increased as the unconventional conversations became clipped online as memes on social media platforms including Instagram, TikTok, and Twitter. The channel was also created around the time AI-generated music covers sung by SpongeBob characters was trending, further contributing to its popularity. Clips of characters discussing the 2006 Honda Civic and claiming 12 August 2036 would be the heat death of the universe became particularly popular as memes. Despite being designed with the intention to run indefinitely as a livestream, the channel generally only ran every other day in the mornings for between two and five hours, occasionally going offline for a few minutes or producing incomprehensible, glitchy dialogue. The original channel has since been listed as "unavailable" on Twitch, and has been removed from YouTube for violating its community guidelines.

== Legality ==
Concerns about legality were raised nearly immediately after the channel began. While parodies are allowed on Twitch, the use of exact names, exact voices, and accurate 3D models of the subject being parodied together was regarded as possibly being too close to the original to not be a violation of copyright. The same reasons were used as possible justification for the company which produces SpongeBob SquarePants, Nickelodeon, to issue a notice and take down, though the channel never became large enough to warrant this. Alongside this, the repeated conversations about sexual topics were enough to violate Twitch's terms of service on multiple occasions, which state "phone sex, chat sex, or otherwise engaging with other person(s) or chat to create sexual content" is not allowed.

== Reception ==
Reactions to the channel were mixed. In the days following launch, the channel had about 1,300 followers on Twitch. By the end of the month, this number had increased to 26,000, with an active viewership of around 3,500 at any given time each stream. After being banned from Twitch and moving to YouTube, the channel had a subscriber count of about 221,000 by early June. In terms of professional reviews, Rhiannon Bevan of the Canadian media company TheGamer referred to the channel as "perhaps the most disturbing use of AI so far", when referring to its repeated conversations about sexual topics. Christian Harrison of the entertainment publisher Dot Esports commented the channel had potential to improve in quality and dialogue if they continued to operate and became more popular, but were unlikely to be "able to make a comeback in any capacity" after receiving bans. Madeline Carpou of American website The Mary Sue referred to the channel in a more positive light when referring to its unconventional conversations as being "reminiscent of the sort of things we wanted AI to be—just good fun, and nothing else."

Additionally, The Mary Sue and other media warned the use of channels using artificial intelligence, like ai_sponge, to create entertainment could automate the work of voice actors and game developers, putting their jobs at risk and leading to business closures. This issue was one of the contributing factors of the 2023 SAG-AFTRA strike, which occurred while the channel was active.

== See also ==
- 15.ai
- Twitch Plays Pokémon
- TrumporBiden2024
- Oasis (Minecraft clone)
- Neuro-sama
