= Genie (world model) =

Interactive world generators

Genie is a family of world models developed by Google DeepMind that generate interactive virtual worlds. First introduced in 2024, Genie was initially trained on video game footage and could only generate two-dimensional environments.

Later versions had higher resolution and increased memory capabilities and could generate three-dimensional environments. Waymo used Genie 3 to create a variant called the Waymo World Model for simulating edge cases for robotaxis. In 2026, Google released Project Genie, a web interface that allows subscribers to use Genie 3. Genie is used in video game design and autonomous vehicles.

== Versions ==
=== Genie ===
The original Genie model was introduced in February 2024, with 11 billion parameters. It was a spatiotemporal transformer that modeled both the structure within individual frames and the changes between frames. It operated in a latent space, a representation for controllable actions inferred from unlabeled video.

It was trained unsupervised without action labels on over 200,000 hours of internet videos (filtered to 30,000 hours of 2D platformer gameplay). It generated frames of the world from interactive input and previous frames. The model generated two-dimensional environments at one frame per second.

=== Genie 2 ===
Genie 2, introduced in December 2024, had the capability of generating three-dimensional environments as well as two-dimensional ones. It was limited to generating 10–20-second worlds from isometric and first-person perspectives. Compared to Oasis, Genie 2 has greater memory and rendering capabilities. Genie 2 could generate worlds in 360p resolution.

=== Genie 3 ===
Genie 3, introduced in August 2025, is capable of generating and modifying interactive worlds in real time. It has a memory of one minute, which is higher than Genie 2's 10–20 seconds. Genie 3 generates interactive worlds at 720p and 24 frames per second, and can produce street environments using Google Street View data.

=== Genie 4 ===
Genie 4 was announced on October 27, 2026. Improvements include synchronous audio, realtime shaping, photo-realistic rendering, improved detail, egocentric perspective, runtime prompting, better integration between the diffusion model and Gemini, and internal changes to position the model for future robotic training/integration.

== Applications ==
Genie was designed for applications in robotics and simulations. It has been used in video game design, including creating imitations of Nintendo's games Super Mario 64 and The Legend of Zelda: Breath of the Wild.

=== Self-driving cars ===
Waymo adopted Genie 3 to create the Waymo World Model, a system for simulating edge cases faced by robotaxis. Compared with Genie 3, it outputs lidar four times faster, produces more realistic driving environments, converts 2D video output into 3D lidar, and speeds up generated footage four times. It accepts dashcam or smartphone video as input and provides three forms of simulation control: driving action control, which determines how the model responds to driving input; scene layout control, which specifies the road layout and the behavior of other vehicles; and language control, which specifies environmental conditions, time of day, and synthetic scenes. It later helped introduce Waymo's robotaxis to 11 cities in the United States.

== Project Genie ==
Project Genie is a website that allows AI Ultra subscribers to access Genie 3 and Genie 4. It was released on January 29, 2026. It is accessible via Google Labs, an experimental products platform. The site limits world exploration to 60 seconds because Genie 3 is an autoregressive model that requires substantial dedicated compute, making longer sessions too expensive to scale to more users. DeepMind says extending the limit would add relatively little testing value while significantly increasing compute costs.

In generated worlds, the WASD keys are used to move, the arrow keys are used to turn the camera, and the space bar is used to ascend. Project Genie has an integration with Google Street View, allowing it to also generate streets.

== Reception ==
Following its release, the stock prices of several video game companies declined. Thomas Smith of Fast Company reported that Genie could help users create new types of games in the future, games where users can build custom worlds based on their own preferences.

Jay Peters of The Verge found that it could generate the worlds of Nintendo games but not worlds containing Disney characters, describing its performance as slow. Smith argued that its limitation of 24 fps was insufficient for practical applications, describing it as "too choppy for real-world use", with modern systems capable of achieving 120 fps at the time of its release. TechCrunch reporter Rebecca Bellan also discovered that model generation was limited, noting that it could not generate content related to nudity or copyrighted material.
