= Pascale Fung =

Professor

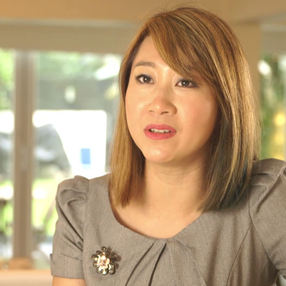
- Born: Shanghai, China
- Education: PhD from Columbia University in 1997
- Alma mater: PhD in Computer Science from Columbia University
- Occupation: Professor at Hong Kong University of Science & Technology
- Employer: Hong Kong University of Science & Technology
- Website: Personal website

Pascale Fung (馮雁) (born in Shanghai, China) is a co-founder and Chief Research and Innovation Officer of AMI Labs, an artificial intelligence research company focused on world models. She is a professor in the Department of Electronic & Computer Engineering and the Department of Computer Science & Engineering at the Hong Kong University of Science & Technology (HKUST). She is the director of the Centre for AI Research (CAiRE) at HKUST. She is an elected Fellow of the Institute of Electrical and Electronics Engineers (IEEE) for her “contributions to human-machine interactions”, an elected Fellow of the International Speech Communication Association for “fundamental contributions to the interdisciplinary area of spoken language human-machine interactions” and an elected Fellow of the Association for Computational Linguistics (ACL) for her “significant contributions toward statistical NLP, comparable corpora, and building intelligent systems that can understand and empathize with humans”.

She is a member of the Global Future Council on Artificial Intelligence and Robotics, a think tank of the World Economic Forum, and blogs for the Forum's online publication Agenda. She is a member of the Partnership on AI. She has been invited as an AI expert to different government initiatives in China, Japan, the UAE, India, the European Union and the United Nations.

Fung's publication topics include spoken language systems, natural language processing, and empathetic human-robot interaction. She co-founded the Human Language Technology Center (HLTC) and is an affiliated faculty with the Robotics Institute and the Big Data Institute, both at HKUST. Additionally, she is the founding chair of the Women Faculty Association at HKUST. She is actively involved in encouraging young women into careers in engineering and science.

== Career and research interests ==
Can a robot have empathy?

Fung's work is focused on building systems that try to understand and empathize with humans. She has authored and co-authored hundreds of publications, along with many journal listings and book chapters. Fung is often found in the media, among others as a writer for Scientific American, the World Economic Forum, and the London School of Economics, and the Design Society. She was a pioneer in using statistical models for natural language understanding. Her PhD thesis proposed unsupervised methods for aligning texts and mining dictionary translations in different languages by distributional properties. She is an expert in spoken language understanding and computer emotional intelligence, and is a strong proponent of technology transfer. Fung has applied many of her research group's results in the fields of, among others, robotics, IoT, and financial analytics. Her efforts led to the launch of the world's first Chinese natural language search engine in 2001, the first Chinese virtual assistant for smartphones in 2010, and the first emotional intelligent speaker in 2017.

== Honors ==
- Elected Fellow, Association for the Advancement of Artificial Intelligence (AAAI), for “significant contributions to the field of Conversational AI and to the development of ethical AI principles and algorithms”
- Elected Fellow, Association for Computational Linguistics (ACL), for “significant contributions toward statistical NLP, comparable corpora, and building intelligent systems that can understand and empathize with humans”
- Nominee, the VentureBeat AI Innovation Awards at Transform 2020, for "AI for Good"
- Awardee, 2017 Outstanding Women Professionals & Entrepreneurs Award, Hong Kong Women Professionals & Entrepreneurs Association
- Elected Fellow, Institute of Electrical and Electronics Engineers (IEEE), for “contributions to human-machine interactions”
- Elected Fellow, International Speech Communication Association (ISCA), for “fundamental contributions to the interdisciplinary area of spoken language human-machine interactions"
- Member, Global Future Council on AI and Robotics, World Economic Forum (2016–)
- One of the Top 50 Women of Hope, selected by List Magazine in 2014
- Selected as “My Favorite Teacher” by top engineering students in 2007 and in 2009

== Affiliations ==
Fung is affiliated with the following institutions and organizations:

- Hong Kong University of Science and Technology
- World Economic Forum
- Institute of Electrical and Electronics Engineers
- Association for Computational Linguistics
- International Speech Communication Association
- Association for Computing Machinery
- Association for the Advancement of Artificial Intelligence

== See also ==
- Kathleen McKeown
- Roberto Pieraccini
- Julia Hirschberg
- Tony F. Chan
- Shrikanth Narayanan
