= Glassybaby =

Glass candle holder crafters

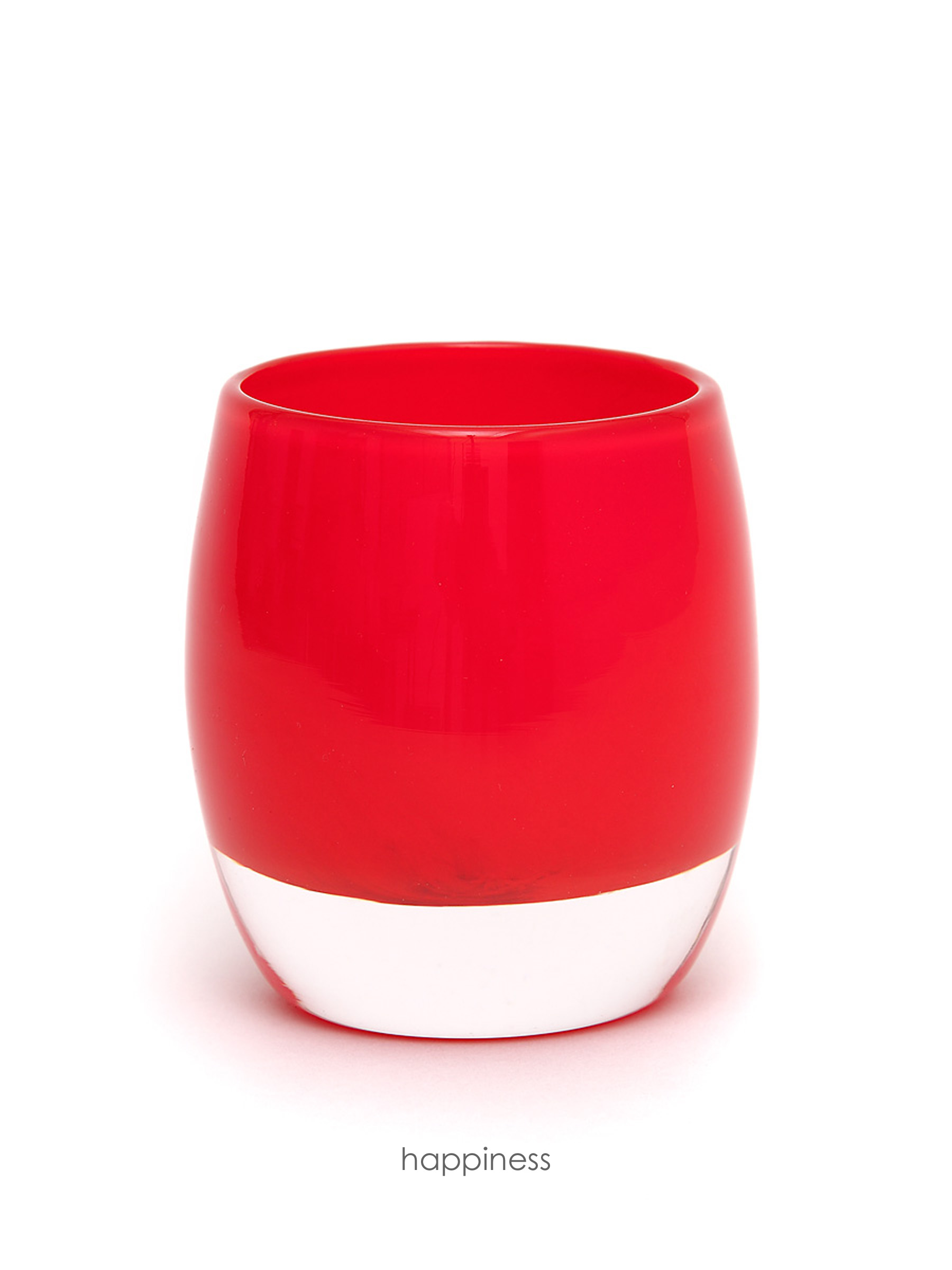
- Typical glassybaby
- Type: private company
- Founded: 2001 in Seattle
- Founder: Lee Rhodes
- Headquarters: Seattle, Washington
- Number of locations: 5 stores (2023)
- Products: hand-blown glass candle votives, drinkware
- Website: www.glassybaby.com

glassybaby is a company based in Seattle, Washington that produces handmade glass votive candle holders, called glassybaby, which are sold online and at stores in the Seattle area and Oregon. The company plans to open a store in Montana as of 2023. The company donates money from sales to charities helping cancer patients with costs during chemotherapy and other charities "dedicated to healing".

== History ==
While undergoing cancer treatment in 1995, Lee Rhodes's husband Emery produced small glass cups which Lee would light with tea light candles to find solace during treatments. Encouraged by the demand from her friends, Rhodes hired local glassblowers in 1998 to produce more glassybaby, and began selling them out of her garage.

The company was incorporated in 2001. In 2003, Rhodes set up a glassblowing studio in Seattle’s old Vitamilk Dairy building, since demolished. In September 2005, Rhodes appeared on Martha Stewart's television show, which led to a significant increase in sales.

Also in 2009, Jeff Bezos purchased a 22 percent stake in glassybaby. A spokeswoman for Bezos suggested that he thought the company, which grossed over $2 million in 2008, could eventually reach the $100 million mark in sales.

In 2011, glassybaby hired Greg Huey from the Alliance of Angels as President and COO. As of 2021, glassybaby has employed Tracy Morgan as their President.

=== Locations ===
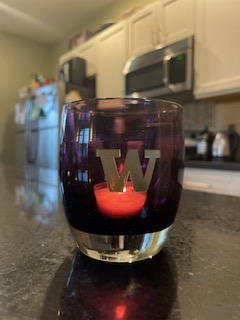
The "UW" glassybaby, to show University of Washington college pride

In 2007, glassybaby moved to a studio and retail shop in Seattle’s Madrona neighborhood. Two years later, the company opened additional locations in Seattle’s University District, Bellevue, and New York City. The New York City store closed in 2012. Before closing, it was the subject of a New York Times case study which detailed the difficulties experienced by the store. In 2013, glassybaby opened a retail outlet in San Francisco's Presidio Heights neighborhood. In 2015, the company opened their first California hot shop in Berkeley, a 13,000 square-foot workshop and retail space. glassybaby also opened retail stores in Palo Alto and San Francisco. The break and economic crisis of COVID-19 in 2020 caused glassybaby in California to shut down, and not reopen after the pandemic. glassybaby has a store located outside Portland in Lake Oswego, Oregon. In early 2022, glassybaby announced a new space in Livingston, Montana, with the local county in strong support. The Livingston location will include both a retail store and a hot shop. It was expected to open in March 2023.

=== Charitable giving ===
From its inception, glassybaby has donated money from sales to charities that serve the needs of cancer patients. By October, 2017, glassybaby had donated more than $8,000,000 to 400 different charities. Among the supported charities are the Seattle Cancer Care Alliance, University of Washington Medical Center, Gilda's Club New York City, Memorial Sloan-Kettering, The Humane Society of the United States, and Conservation International. By November 2022, $13,000,000 in donations was surpassed. Every non-profit organization that receives donations from glassybaby is focused on either helping the healing of humans, animals, or the environment.

=== Craft and Product ===
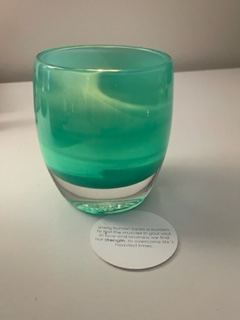
This is the glassybaby votive called "strength" along with the circle card poem behind it.

glassybaby's products consist of candle votive holders and drinking glasses (in both wine and whiskey style glasses). These products are made at two of glassybaby's retail shops (in downtown Seattle and Seattle's neighborhood of Madrona), in a large warehouse in Redmond, Washington and Livingston, Montana.

The art of glassblowing dates back to centuries ago, with roots to Syrian craftsmen (around the 1st century BC). glassybaby employs 80 glassblowers as of 2022, and to create glassybaby they use rods of concentrated colored glass (referred to as "color bars" or cane), in which all colors in the rod are derived from natural resources. The process of creating a glassybaby involves three different furnaces and different steps called gathering, trimming, stamping, and annealing. To create one single glassybaby three to six different glassblowers are required, and the process takes 15 minutes (not including cooling).

glassybaby candle votives are made in more than 400 colors, and drinking glasses are made in 25 different colors. glassybaby's main slogan is "one of a kindness" which markets that because votives and drinkware are handmade, no two of their products are alike. Each glassybaby is given a different name, and the founder's son, Mericos, writes poems for each name and meaning. Candle votives range from $70 to $200, and drinking glasses range from $75 to $125.

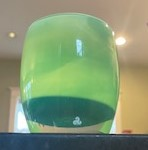
At the bottom of this glassybaby, you can see the triskelion symbol.

glassybaby in 2019 started etching a logo onto each of their products called the "triskelion" (trisk-uh-lin), to patent each of their products. The Triskelion is meant to resemble giving; craft; and family.
