= Fundbox =

Working capital platform

- Founded: August 2013 in Israel
- Founders: Eyal Shinar, Tomer Michaeli, Yuval Ariav
- Headquarters: San Francisco, California
- Key people: Prashant Fuloria (CEO)
- Website: fundbox.com

Fundbox is a working capital platform based in San Francisco that offers credit and payments as a service to small businesses. Founded in 2013, the company innovates technology to help optimize cash flow for small businesses.

== History ==
The concept for Fundbox was partially inspired by co-founder Eyal Shinar's mother, who struggled with late payments at the employment agency she owned and operated in Israel. Founded by Yuval Ariav, Eyal Shinar, and Tomer Michaeli in 2013, it operated for a year in stealth mode before becoming available to the public in 2014. After launch, it announced it had received $17.5 million in funding from investors led by Khosla Ventures. In 2020, Fundbox hired Marten Abrahamsen, a former investment banker, as the company's chief financial officer.

As of November 2021, the company has received a total of $410 million in funding and a valuation of $1.1 billion, including $100 million in funding led by Healthcare of Ontario Pension Plan.

== Services ==
Fundbox offers working capital products to small businesses. Its primary offering is a revolving line of credit to manage cash flow. Fundbox uses a banking partner to give short-term funds up to $100,000. It also offers membership-based offerings and payments which include Flex Pay, which provides additional payment options for business expenses. Its services are offered online and through a tech platform that integrates with QuickBooks, FreshBooks, Xero and Indeed.
