= Athene (gamer) =

Belgian YouTuber, streamer and philanthropist

Bachir Boumaaza
- Born: June 9, 1980 (age 46); Borgerhout, Antwerp, Belgium
- Other names: Chiren, Athene
- Occupations: YouTuber; live streamer; activist; blogger; ex–Razer USA representative
- Years active: 2007–present

Twitch information
- Channel: athenelive
- Years active: 2013–present
- Genre: Gaming
- Followers: 249 thousand
- Last updated: 7 December 2025
- Website: gamingforgood.net singularitygroup.net

Bachir Boumaaza (born 9 June 1980), known by the online pseudonym Athene, is a Belgian internet personality and Twitch streamer and YouTuber. He is best known as a World of Warcraft content creator. He is the founder of Gaming for Good and has been involved in numerous charity gaming events to raise money for charities such as Save the Children.

== Early life ==
Born in Borgerhout, Antwerp, Belgium, Boumaaza was born to a Moroccan father and a Belgian mother. His mother, Nicole Ceulemans, is a writer of children's books. Both his parents worked in the Justice Department. Boumaaza claimed, in his book Mijn egotrip, that his childhood was chaotic due to the cultural differences between his mother and father. Being confronted with social issues, including racism and poverty, he says he was instilled with a sense of responsibility to change these conditions. Boumaaza was introduced to video games at a young age.

== Political career and activism ==
Boumaaza entered politics in 2000, and joined the progressive party, Young Green. The party was the youth organization of Groen, formerly known as Agalev. He was, at the age of 20, chosen as a political candidate for Agalev and participated in the Belgian local elections, 2000.

In 2005, Boumaaza co-founded the Belgian political organization, NEE. Boumaaza operated as the official spokesperson and led the organization. NEE was a political movement aimed at voters who felt dissatisfied with the political climate. As voting is mandatory in Belgium, NEE provided dissatisfied voters with a means to vote that an elected seat be unoccupied, rather than unlawfully casting a blank votes. NEE participated in both the Belgian local elections, 2006 and in the Belgian federal election, 2007 but did not receive enough votes to earn a seat in the city council or senate.

Boumaaza spear-headed protests against ISP sales models that undermined net neutrality in 2014 during events such as DreamHack.

== YouTube career ==
Boumaaza began making YouTube videos in 2007. He initially focused on World of Warcraft videos. In his earliest video, he played a character called Athene, an arrogant, conceited gamer. Boumaaza has also supplemented his online video presence by broadcasting himself live on Twitch.

The original Athene series was created in 2007. Boumaaza played the role of a conceited World of Warcraft player named Athene. His YouTube video "Best Paladin of The World pwning nubs on My Heart Will Go On from Celine Dion" marked the beginning of the series. The original series revolved around the strange and fictional character, Athene, and included in-game commentary of World of Warcraft as well as a personal storyline that followed Athene's everyday life.

During his time playing World of Warcraft, Boumaaza attained four world records for reaching the game's level cap, and was the first person to reach levels 80 and 85. By 2013, Boumaaza's YouTube videos had been watched more than 382 million times, and his channel had reached nearly 600,000 subscribers.

The series also featured a mockumentary named Wrath of the 1337 King which followed Athene's everyday life. In 2008, Athene created videos with a group called iPower, primarily focused on his World of Warcraft character. The videos made frequent use of misleading titles such as "Sex and Porn is fun" and "Get free sex". Boumaaza's then girlfriend Tania appears in many of the videos and their corresponding thumbnails. Spokesman Reese Leysen said "The way to get lots of views on YouTube is to have a mix of sexiness and total absurdity." The channel's first 20 videos were viewed more than 20 million times.

Boumaaza had been making some videos as part of a contract with Machinima. In 2013, Boumaaza posted a video to YouTube announcing that he would be leaving Machinima in response to its treatment of YouTube creators.

== Charity work ==
As part of the Sharecraft 2012 Save the Children Challenge, Boumaaza partnered with Razer and DC Entertainment to raise more than US$50,000 for charity organization Save the Children. In 2013, Boumaaza created the charitable project "Gaming for Good" to raise money for Save the Children. The project partnered with video game publishers and developers to offer games in exchange for donations to the charity. Through streams on his Twitch account, Boumaaza raised more than US$100,000. By March 2015 the project had raised more than US$150,000 in total, and Boumaaza was an official ambassador for Save the Children.

In September 2013, Gaming for Good coordinated a fundraising event called "The Siege". The Siege was a World of Warcraft event where two top guilds, Midwinter and Method raced to complete a raid. The campaign raised over U$2 million over the weekend, quadrupling the initial goal of $500,000. Boumaaza travelled to Liberia to film a documentary on the Ebola crisis. In 2015, Boumaaza assembled a team of livestreamers called The Avengers - a reference to the Marvel superhero team The Avengers - who, over the course of 10 days, raised more than 320,000 euros.

== The Singularity Group ==
Boumaaza is currently the face of an organization called The Singularity Group. In 2019, video game journalist Chris Bratt of People Make Games published the result of a year-long investigation into Boumaaza and the organization, alleging that Boumaaza is responsible for emotional abuse, misogyny and manipulation of members of the organisation, quoting interviews with ex-members, and showing clips of Boumaaza himself making various statements. Boumaaza denied certain allegations, and called the report a "hit piece".
