= Nothing, Forever =

American procedurally generated sitcom livestream

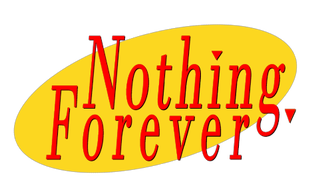
- Genre: Animated sitcom; Parody; Self-referential humor; Interactive fiction; Black comedy
- Created by: Skyler Hartle; Brian Habersberger
- Based on: Seinfeld by: Larry David; Jerry Seinfeld
- Country of origin: United States
- Original language: English
- No. of seasons: 2

Production
- Production company: Mismatch Media

Original release
- Network: Twitch
- Release: December 14, 2022

Nothing, Forever is an American interactive procedurally generated animated sitcom broadcast as a livestream. It was created by American digital art collective Mismatch Media, led by developers Skyler Hartle and Brian Habersberger. Originally started as a direct parody of the American sitcom Seinfeld, the livestream broadcasts permutations of 3D computer-animated sequences in a kitschy retro low-resolution style, where characters perform AI-generated scripts using voices produced through speech synthesis. The first season continuously ran on Twitch from December 14, 2022, until the channel's temporary suspension on February 6, 2023. After the suspension was lifted, the show went on a brief hiatus until the second season debuted on March 8, with a new cast of characters and an original format different from that of Seinfeld.

Nothing, Forever experienced a surge in popularity in February 2023 after media coverage of the show. The nonsensical humor, undistinguished style, and enthusiastic audience activity has received praise.

== Conception and format ==
The concept of Nothing, Forever was envisioned by Skyler Hartle, a product manager at Microsoft Azure, and Brian Habersberger, a polymer physicist, in 2019. The two met over the game Team Fortress 2. The show takes inspiration from Rabbits, a series of web films made by American filmmaker David Lynch, and the show's original premise was a homage to the American sitcom Seinfeld. Hartle said the work "originally started its life as this weird, very, off-center kind of nonsensical, surreal art project. But then we kind of worked over the years to bring it to this new place. And then, of course, generative media [...] just kind of took off in a crazy way over the past couple of years". Hartle and Habersberger formed Mismatch Media in 2022, in collaboration with Jakob Broaddus, Zale Bush, Nic Freeman, Edward Garmon, Xander Reade and Stanley Janoski.

The character of Larry Feinberg delivering a stand-up routine, in the first season of the livestream

The first season's cast of characters included Larry Feinberg, Yvonne Torres, Fred Kastopolous, and Zoltan Kakler, parodies of Jerry Seinfeld, Elaine Benes, George Costanza, and Cosmo Kramer, respectively.

Viewers can interact with the livestream through Twitch's chat function. In contrast to most television shows, the narrative in Nothing, Forever can change depending on the reactions of the viewers. A fictitious 1990s-style electronic program guide with nonsensically generated show names occasionally interrupts the show while new scripts of dialogue are generated.

The second season replaces the original cast of characters with Leo Borges, Nick Sterling, Kelly Coffee and Manfred Fredman. Instead of delivering a stand-up comedy routine, the main character, Leo, begins each episode by writing on his personal blog.

== Development ==
Nothing, Forever is procedurally generated. Dialogue is currently generated through GPT-3, a language model from OpenAI. Other technologies used include Stable Diffusion, DALL-E, and Azure Cognitive Services. To generate new scenes, an Azure Function written in TypeScript is used. The machine learning models were written in Python using TensorFlow, while the show is rendered using Unity and C#.

To fund the show, Mismatch Media maintains a Patreon. The highest tier allows viewers to request an appearance of a character based on them within the show. Twitch streamer xQc purchased the tier on a livestream.

== Suspension ==
On February 6, 2023, the Twitch channel for Nothing, Forever received a 14-day suspension, with the developers attributing this to an unspecified piece of standup dialogue. In a statement to The Washington Post, Hartle expressed embarrassment about the incident. Twitch did not give a public reason for the suspension, but users in the stream's Discord suspected it to have been due to a controversial joke delivered by the Feinberg character shortly before the suspension. During a stand-up scene, the character said that he was "thinking about" telling routines with offensive jokes, including comparing the state of being transgender to mental illness and references to the gay agenda. The character then observed that "no one's laughing", and abruptly stopped the routine, asking "Where'd everybody go?"

According to Mismatch Media, OpenAI's primary model for GPT-3, Davinci, had been experiencing outages that were disrupting the broadcast. The creators switched over to Curie, a less sophisticated model, which they said resulted in "inappropriate text" being generated. The creators stated the content moderation tools used for the Davinci model "were not successful with Curie", and that they had resolved the issue with Davinci and would not be returning to Curie as a fallback in the future.

Mismatch Media announced plans to implement additional "guardrails" to prevent inappropriate content, stating they "feel very strongly that it’s our duty as people in the generative space to do this as safely as possible". They also hoped to eventually introduce ways for the Twitch chat audience to safely interact with the show and shape its contents, as well as planning to create a platform "within the next six to 12 months" which allows others to make similar shows. The stream returned on March 8.

On or around October 26, 2023, the stream began to loop without interruption, with two of its characters standing silently in front of a refrigerator. This continued until the evening of October 30, and received coverage from Kotaku and PC Gamer.

== Reception ==
Nothing, Forever's first season received a mostly positive reception. Ash Parrish of The Verge found the stream nonsensical, yet humorous. Engadget's Will Shanklin was more critical of the show's surrealist humor, comparing the voices of Larry and Fred to the Beavis and Butt-Head character Mr. Van Driessen. The Twitter account for Seinfeld acknowledged the show, tweeting a link to the Twitch channel and referencing George's line about "robot butchers" in the episode "The Stock Tip".

Upon its debut, the second season of Nothing, Forever received a negative response from audiences, who criticized the departure from the Seinfeld-based format. Levi Winslow of Kotaku noted "the meta-humor that came with parodying Seinfeld is no longer there" and that the new format felt "neutered, or like the show was canceled only to be picked up by an entirely different network."

The livestream has drawn comparisons to Twitch Plays Pokémon, a social experiment livestreamed on Twitch. A similarly structured project, ai_sponge, based on the SpongeBob SquarePants television series, began livestreaming on YouTube and Twitch in March 2023.

As of April 2026, the Twitch channel is still streaming 24/7, with an average concurrent audience of approximately 8-9 viewers, with a peak of 19 viewers.
