= Wilmès I Government =

- 96th Cabinet of Belgium (since 1830)

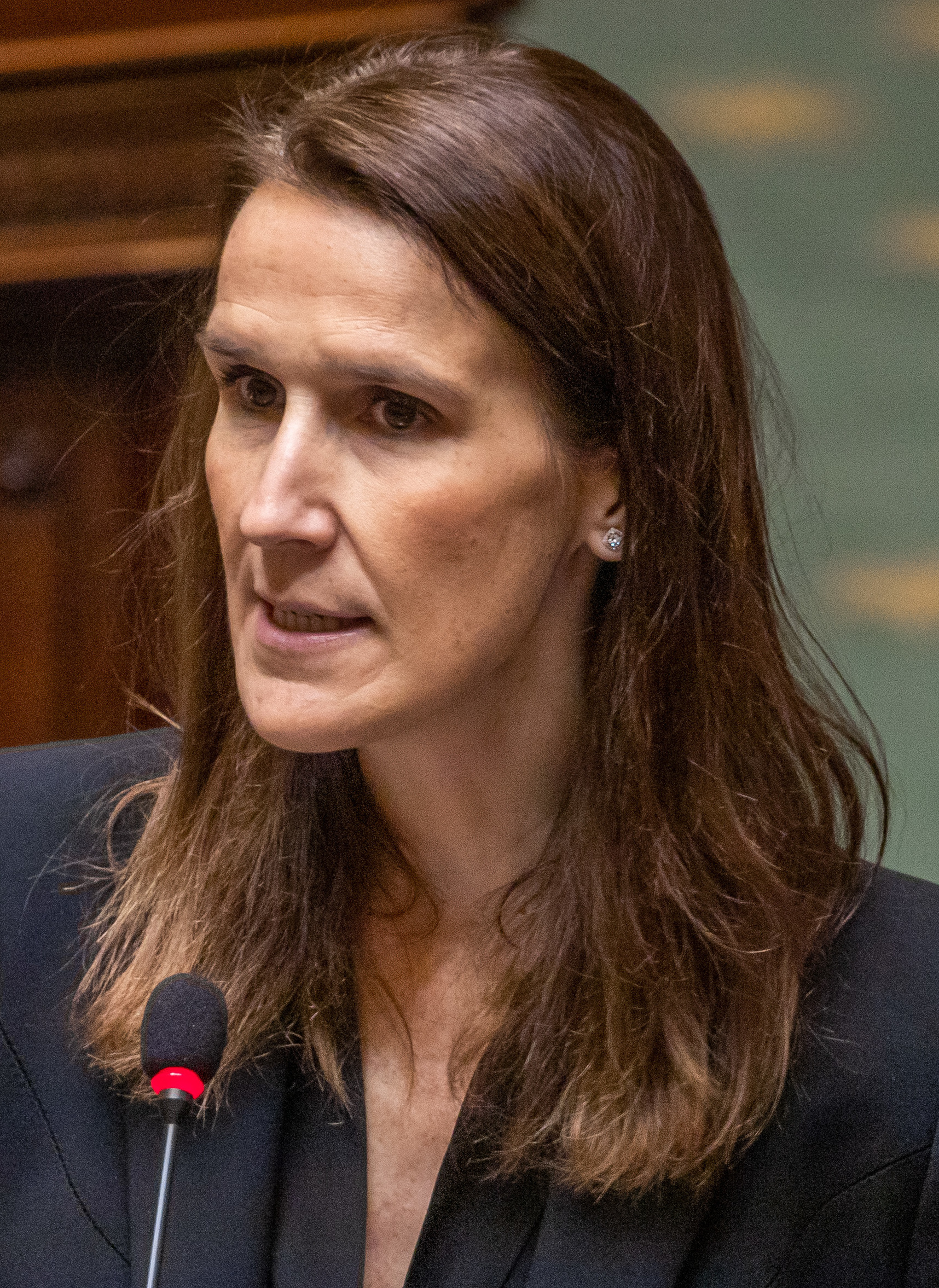
- Date formed: 27 October 2019
- Date dissolved: 17 March 2020

People and organisations
- Head of state: Philippe of Belgium
- Head of government: Sophie Wilmès
- No. of ministers: 12
- Member parties: MR (Walloon); CD&V (Flemish); Open Vld (Flemish)
- Status in legislature: Caretaker minority coalition

History
- Election: 2014 Belgian federal election
- Legislature term: 2014–2019
- Budgets: 18 July 2019; continuing resolution (3rd)
- Predecessor: Michel II
- Successor: Wilmès II

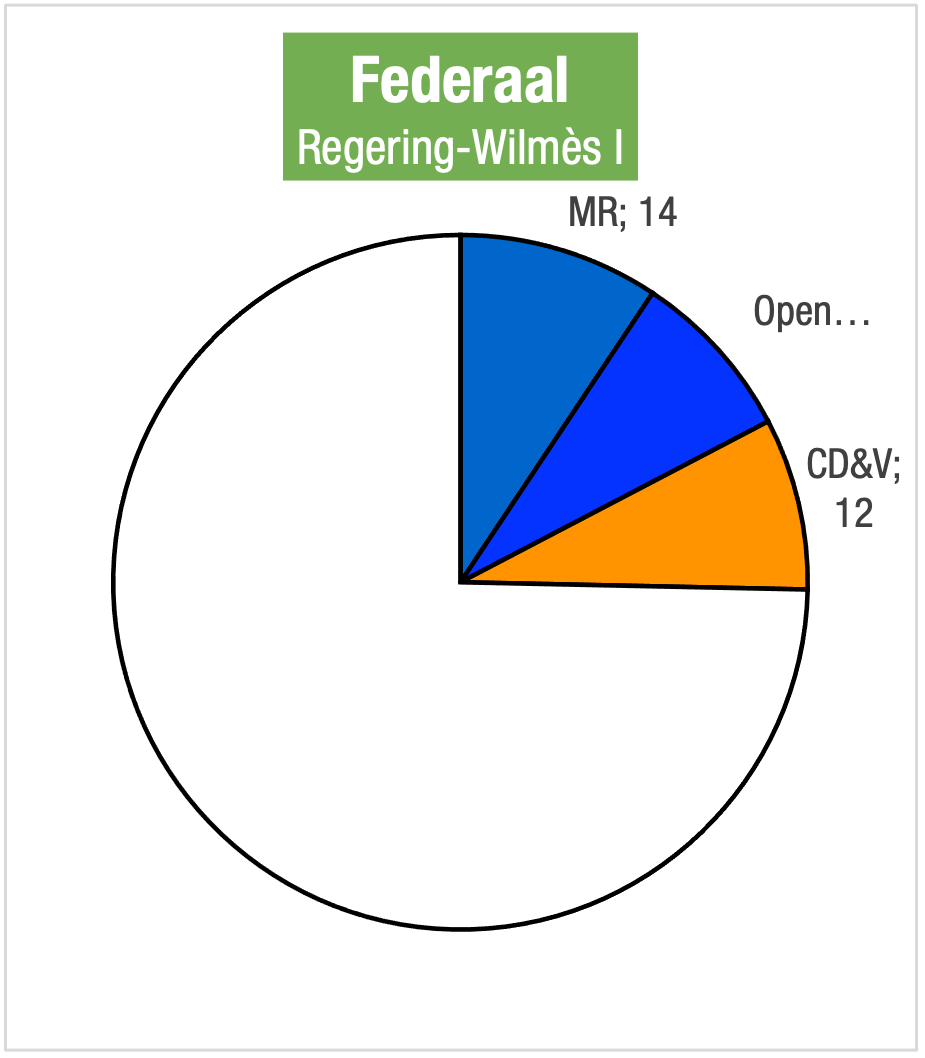
Distribution of seats in the Chamber of Representatives

The Wilmès I Government was a caretaker Federal Government of Belgium, led by Prime Minister Sophie Wilmès, the first ever female prime minister of Belgium.

== History ==
The creation of the Wilmès Government was announced on 26 October 2019, when previous prime minister Charles Michel announced he would be succeeded by Sophie Wilmès ultimately on 1 November 2019, effectively forming a new government. Charles Michel left his post as he had been elected to become the next President of the European Council as from 1 December 2019 and wanted to have sufficient time to prepare for his role as President of the European Council hence leaving already by November.

The Wilmès Government was governing as a caretaker government, until a new cabinet was formed based on the results of the federal elections of 26 May 2019, for which negotiations were still ongoing. Hence the government was a continuation of the centre minority coalition cabinet of Christian Democratic and Flemish (CD&V), the Open Flemish Liberals and Democrats (Open Vld) and the Reformist Movement (MR) which together constituted the Michel II Government. On 16 March, the Wilmès Government was given support by several opposition parties to handle the coronavirus outbreak in Belgium, for which the cabinet was going to be supported by a majority in parliament by granting it special powers under the form of the Wilmès II Government. The opposition parties were giving support for three months to take corona measures, with a possible further three month extension, were the socialists (sp.a & PS), the greens (Groen and Ecolo), the cdH and DéFI, leaving only the N-VA and the PVDA/PTB and Vlaams Belang in the opposition.

== Composition ==
The composition of the government was similar to that of the Michel II Government, with the only differences being Sophie Wilmès taking over the role of Charles Michel as prime minister and David Clarinval coming in to replace Wilmès as Minister of Budget, Civil Service, National Lottery and Scientific Policy.

Portfolio	Minister	Took office	Left office	Party
Prime Minister
Prime Minister	Sophie Wilmès	27 October 2019	17 March 2020	MR
Deputy Prime Ministers
Minister of Justice and Director of Buildings	Koen Geens	27 October 2019	17 March 2020	CD&V
Minister of Foreign Affairs, Defence, Beliris and European Affairs	Didier Reynders	27 October 2019	30 November 2019	MR
Minister of Budget, Civil Service, National Lottery and Scientific Policy	David Clarinval	30 November 2019	17 March 2020	MR
Minister of Development Cooperation, Finance and fighting Fiscal Fraud	Alexander De Croo	27 October 2019	17 March 2020	Open Vld
Minister
Minister of Administrative Simplification, Digital Agenda, Postal Services and Telecom	Philippe De Backer	27 October 2019	17 March 2020	Open Vld
Minister of the Interior and Safety	Pieter De Crem	27 October 2019	17 March 2020	CD&V
Minister of Asylum, Migration, Health and Social Affairs	Maggie De Block	27 October 2019	17 March 2020	Open Vld
Minister of Consumer Affairs, Disabled Persons, Economy, Employment, Equal Rights and Fighting Poverty	Nathalie Muylle	27 October 2019	17 March 2020	CD&V
Minister of the Middle Class, SMEs, Self-employed, Agriculture, Social Integration and Urban Policy	Denis Ducarme	27 October 2019	17 March 2020	MR
Minister of Budget, Civil Service, National Lottery and Scientific Policy	David Clarinval	27 October 2019	30 November 2019	MR
Minister of Pensions	Daniel Bacquelaine	27 October 2019	17 March 2020	MR
Minister of Mobility and the National Railway Company	François Bellot	27 October 2019	17 March 2020	MR
Minister of Foreign Affairs, Defence and European Affairs	Philippe Goffin	30 November 2019	17 March 2020	MR
Minister of Energy, Environment and Sustainable Development	Marie-Christine Marghem	27 October 2019	17 March 2020	MR

=== Changes in composition ===
- On 30 November 2019, Philippe Goffin took the place of Didier Reynders, taking over the portfolios of Foreign Affairs and Defence. Reynders left his post to take up the role of European Commissioner for Justice in the Von der Leyen Commission. David Clarinval was appointed the new deputy prime minister for the Mouvement Réformateur
