= Michel II Government =

- 95th Cabinet of Belgium (since 1830)

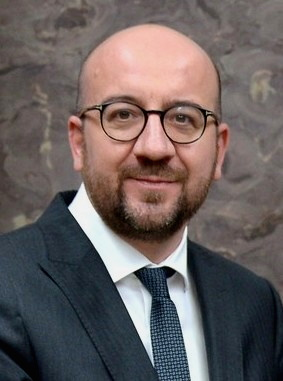
- Date formed: 9 December 2018
- Date dissolved: 27 October 2019

People and organisations
- Head of state: Philippe of Belgium
- Head of government: Charles Michel
- No. of ministers: 12
- Member parties: MR (Walloon); CD&V (Flemish); Open Vld (Flemish)
- Status in legislature: Minority (coalition)

History
- Election: 2014 Belgian federal election
- Legislature term: 2014–2019
- Budgets: 18 July 2019; continuing resolution (3rd)
- Incoming formation: 8 December 2018
- Outgoing formation: 18 December 2018
- Predecessor: Michel I
- Successor: Wilmès I

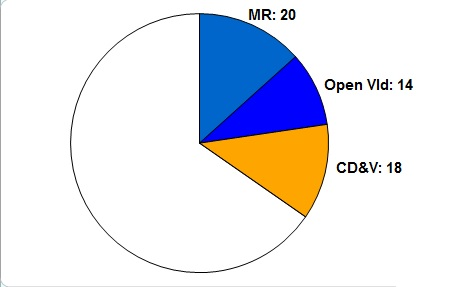
Composition in the Chamber of Representatives

The Michel II Government was the Federal Government of Belgium, led by Prime Minister Charles Michel from 18 December 2018 until 27 October 2019 when it was succeeded by the Wilmès I Government. It was a centre minority coalition cabinet of Christian Democratic and Flemish (CD&V), the Open Flemish Liberals and Democrats (Open Vld) and the Reformist Movement (MR). On 26 October 2019, it was announced that Sophie Wilmès would take over the role of Prime Minister from Michel on 1 November 2019, and form a new government.

== History ==
The government came into existence on 9 December 2018 following the exit of New Flemish Alliance (N-VA) from the Michel I Government. As the Prime Minister did not offer the government's resignation to the King until the 18th, it is constitutionally still the same government as the one that started in 2014, albeit a heavily reshuffled government following the resignation of all N-VA ministers and secretaries of state. Politically, however, it is in an entirely different situation, as it has no support from N-VA and thus operates as a new government.

On 10 December, several parties had called for the government to propose a motion of confidence.

Michel attempted to continue with the minority cabinet with support from the centre-left opposition, who instead announced on 18 December that they would submit a motion of no confidence against the cabinet.

On 18 December, Premier Michel offered his resignation to King Philippe.

On 20 December, the Chamber of Representatives almost unanimously voted a draft budget to enable provisional spending for the first three months of 2019 based on the 2018 budget.

The King accepted Michel's resignation on 21 December after consulting party leaders. The outgoing cabinet continues governing as a caretaker government, likely until after the European Parliament, Belgian regional and federal elections of 26 May 2019.

On 2 July 2019, Prime Minister Charles Michel was elected to become the next President of the European Council as from 1 December 2019. With no new government formed, Sophie Wilmès was appointed to take over the role of Prime Minister from 27 October 2019, to allow Charles Michel sufficient time to prepare for his role as President of the European Council.

== Composition ==
Cabinet members
Portfolio	Minister	Took office	Left office	Party
Prime Minister
Prime Minister	Charles Michel	9 December 2018	27 October 2019	MR
Deputy Prime Ministers
Minister of Consumer Affairs, Disabled Persons, Economy, Employment, Equal Rights and Fighting Poverty	Kris Peeters	9 December 2018	25 June 2019	CD&V
Minister of Justice and Director of Buildings	Koen Geens	9 December 2018	27 October 2019	CD&V
Minister of Foreign Affairs, Defence, Beliris and European Affairs	Didier Reynders	9 December 2018	27 October 2019	MR
Minister of Development Cooperation, Finance and fighting Fiscal Fraud	Alexander De Croo	9 December 2018	27 October 2019	Open Vld
Ministers
Minister of Administrative Simplification, Digital Agenda, Postal Services and Telecom	Philippe De Backer	9 December 2018	27 October 2019	Open Vld
Minister of the Interior and Safety	Pieter De Crem	9 December 2018	27 October 2019	CD&V
Minister of Asylum, Migration, Health and Social Affairs	Maggie De Block	9 December 2018	27 October 2019	Open Vld
Minister of Consumer Affairs, Disabled Persons, Economy, Employment, Equal Rights and Fighting Poverty	Wouter Beke	25 June 2019	2 October 2019	CD&V
Minister of Consumer Affairs, Disabled Persons, Economy, Employment, Equal Rights and Fighting Poverty	Nathalie Muylle	2 October 2019	27 October 2019	CD&V
Minister of the Middle Class, SMEs, Self-employed, Agriculture, Social Integration and Urban Policy	Denis Ducarme	9 December 2018	27 October 2019	MR
Minister of Budget, Civil Service, National Lottery and Scientific Policy	Sophie Wilmès	9 December 2018	27 October 2019	MR
Minister of Pensions	Daniel Bacquelaine	9 December 2018	27 October 2019	MR
Minister of Mobility and the National Railway Company	François Bellot	9 December 2018	27 October 2019	MR
Minister of Energy, Environment and Sustainable Development	Marie-Christine Marghem	9 December 2018	27 October 2019	MR

=== Changes in composition ===
- On 25 June 2019, one month after the 2019 European Parliament elections, Kris Peeters offered his resignation as Deputy Prime Minister and Minister of Consumer Affairs, Disabled Persons, Economy, Employment, Equal Rights and Fighting Poverty to take up his seat in the European Parliament, with CD&V appointing party president Wouter Beke as his replacement two days later, with the exception that the role of Deputy Minister shifted to Koen Geens.
- On 2 October 2019 Wouter Beke was in turn replaced by Nathalie Muylle as Beke took up the position as Flemish Minister for Welfare in the Flemish Government.
