= Wilmès II Government =

Federal government of Belgium in 2020

- 97th Cabinet of Belgium (since 1830)

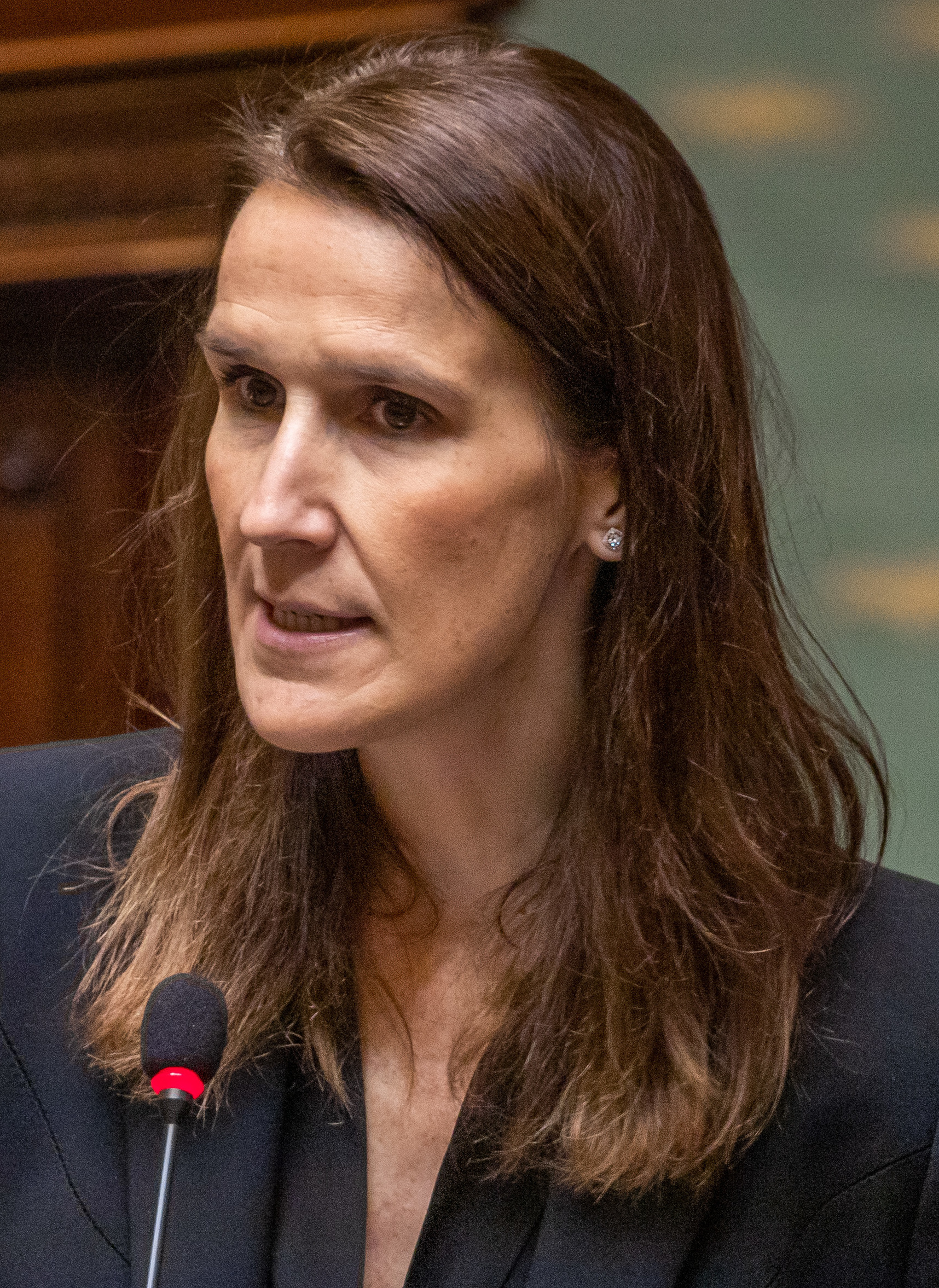
- Date formed: 17 March 2020
- Date dissolved: 1 October 2020

People and organisations
- Head of state: Philippe of Belgium
- Head of government: Sophie Wilmès
- No. of ministers: 12
- Member parties: MR (Francophone); CD&V (Flemish); Open Vld (Flemish)
- Status in legislature: Caretaker minority coalition (with emergency plenary powers)
- Opposition parties: Groen (Flemish); sp.a (Flemish); N-VA (Flemish); VB (Flemish); cdH (Francophone); DéFI (Francophone); Ecolo (Francophone); PS (Francophone); PVDA-PTB

History
- Election: 2019 Belgian federal election
- Legislature term: 2019–2024
- Predecessor: Wilmès I
- Successor: De Croo

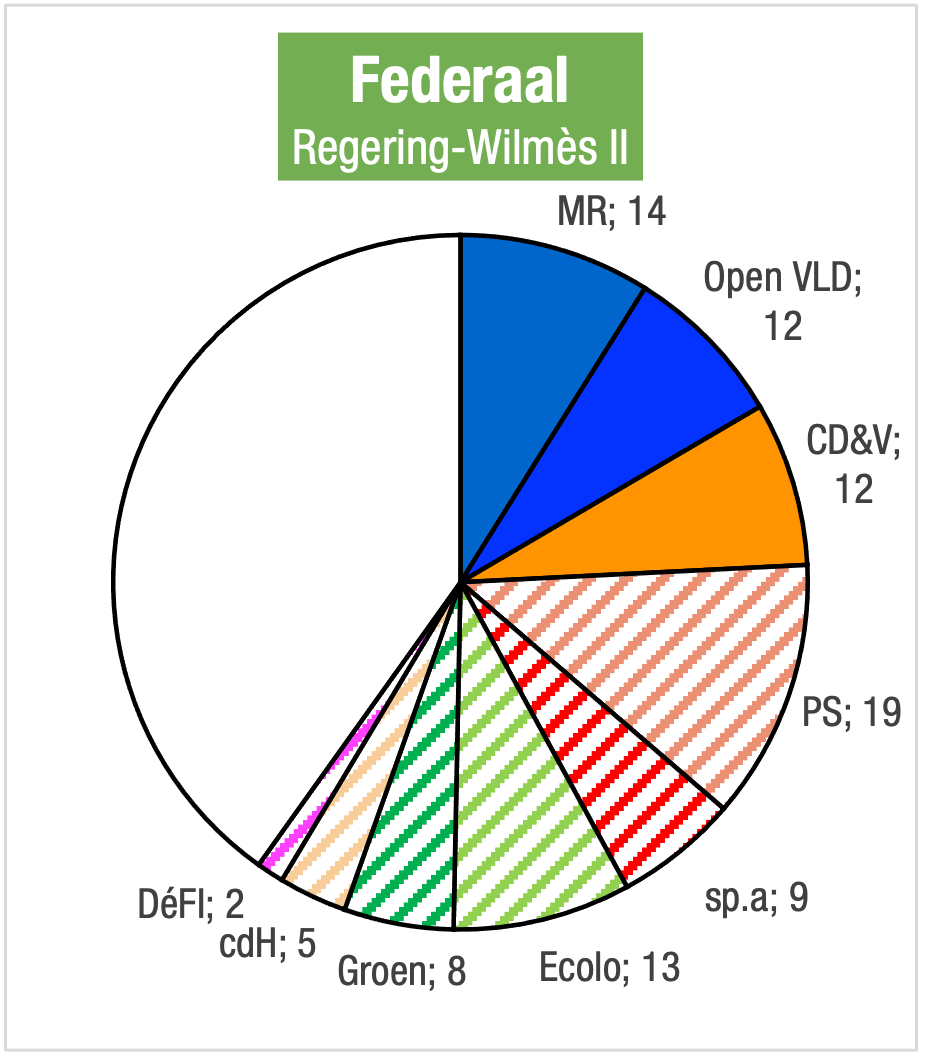
Coalition. Striped parties are not part of the government but supporting it from the opposition.

The Wilmès II Government was a minority Federal Government of Belgium, led by Prime Minister Sophie Wilmès, the first female prime minister of Belgium.

Wilmès had been selected as a caretaker prime minister following the 2019 Belgian federal election, and headed the Wilmès I Government, a minority government with the same party composition as the previous Michel II Government, from 27 October 2019.

On 17 March 2020, the opposition parties sp.a, PS, Groen, Ecolo, cdH and DéFI agreed to give Wilmès the plenary powers needed to deal with the coronavirus outbreak in Belgium, for a period of three months. This was later extended until mid-September 2020, and then 1 October 2020, to allow completion of the 2019–20 Belgian government formation. Upon the end of the process, the Wilmès II Government was replaced by the De Croo Government.

== Composition ==
The composition of the government was identical to that of the last composition of Wilmès I Government.

Cabinet members
Portfolio	Minister	Took office	Left office	Party
Prime Minister
Prime Minister	Sophie Wilmès	17 March 2020	1 October 2020	MR
Deputy Prime Ministers
Minister of Justice and Director of Buildings	Koen Geens	17 March 2020	1 October 2020	CD&V
Minister of Budget, Civil Service, National Lottery and Scientific Policy	David Clarinval	17 March 2020	1 October 2020	MR
Minister of Development Cooperation, Finance and fighting Fiscal Fraud	Alexander De Croo	17 March 2020	1 October 2020	Open Vld
Minister
Minister of Administrative Simplification, Digital Agenda, Postal Services and Telecom	Philippe De Backer	17 March 2020	1 October 2020	Open Vld
Minister of the Interior and Safety	Pieter De Crem	17 March 2020	1 October 2020	CD&V
Minister of Asylum, Migration, Health and Social Affairs	Maggie De Block	17 March 2020	1 October 2020	Open Vld
Minister of Consumer Affairs, Disabled Persons, Economy, Employment, Equal Rights and Fighting Poverty	Nathalie Muylle	17 March 2020	1 October 2020	CD&V
Minister of the Middle Class, SMEs, Self-employed, Agriculture, Social Integration and Urban Policy	Denis Ducarme	17 March 2020	1 October 2020	MR
Minister of Pensions	Daniel Bacquelaine	17 March 2020	1 October 2020	MR
Minister of Mobility and the National Railway Company	François Bellot	17 March 2020	1 October 2020	MR
Minister of Foreign Affairs, Defence and European Affairs	Philippe Goffin	17 March 2020	1 October 2020	MR
Minister of Energy, Environment and Sustainable Development	Marie-Christine Marghem	17 March 2020	1 October 2020	MR
