= Michel I Government =

Federal government of Belgium (2014–2018)

Michel Government
- 94th Cabinet of Belgium (since 1830)

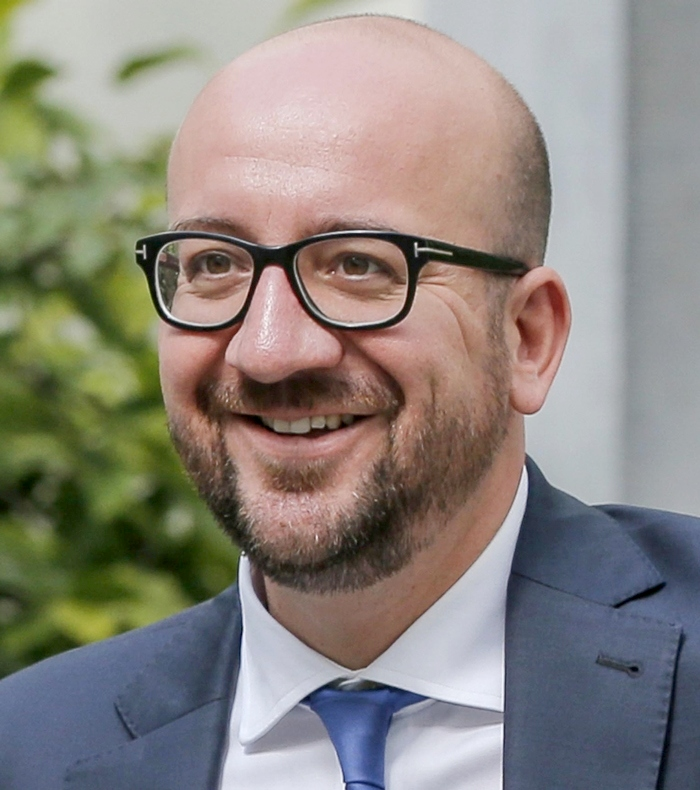
- Date formed: 11 October 2014
- Date dissolved: 9 December 2018 (de facto); 21 December 2018 (de jure)

People and organisations
- Head of state: Philippe of Belgium
- Head of government: Charles Michel
- Member party: N-VA (Flemish); MR (Walloon); CD&V (Flemish); Open Vld (Flemish)
- Status in legislature: Majority (coalition)

History
- Incoming formation: 2014 Belgian government formation
- Election: 2014
- Predecessor: Di Rupo
- Successor: Michel II

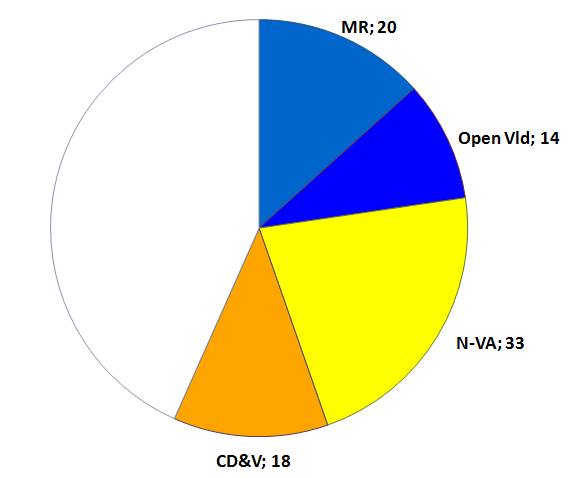
Inaugural coalition majority

The government's nickname, the "Swedish coalition", refers to the flag of Sweden (pictured)

The Michel I Government was the Federal Government of Belgium formed following the 2014 Belgian government formation and sworn in on 11 October 2014. The administration was a centre-right coalition of the New Flemish Alliance (N-VA), the Christian Democratic and Flemish (CD&V), the Open Flemish Liberals and Democrats (Open Vld) and the Reformist Movement (MR). The prime minister was Charles Michel. The government had an agenda of socio-economic reforms, especially through austerity measures, with its priorities being improving Belgium's economic competitiveness and reducing unemployment. It fell in December 2018 over the Global Compact for Migration.

== Investiture and status in parliament ==
The government was sworn in on 11 October 2014, taking the oath of office before King Filip of Belgium. The four parties had a majority in the Chamber of Representatives with 85 members out of 150. On 16 October 2014, the motion of confidence from the Chamber of Representatives was approved by a vote of 84 in favour, 58 against and one abstention (by Aldo Carcaci, the People's Party MP).

The government's number of seats was reduced to 83 when two N-VA members, Hendrik Vuye and Veerle Wouters, left the party in September 2016.

== Coalition ==
The government consists of a centre-right coalition of the New Flemish Alliance (N-VA), Christian Democratic and Flemish (CD&V), the Open Flemish Liberals and Democrats (Open Vld) and the Reformist Movement (MR). It is nicknamed "Swedish coalition" inasmuch as the party colours yellow (N-VA) and blue (liberal, i.e. MR and Open Vld) and the cross (Christianity, i.e. CD&V) are combined on the Swedish flag. Initially (given doubts about its durability) the government was also called a "kamikaze coalition", inasmuch as the MR is the only French-speaking party in the coalition.

For the first time in 25 years, the French-speaking Socialist Party did not become a part of the federal government, whereas the Flemish nationalist N-VA helped form a government for the first time. Initially no French-speaking party wanted to partner with the N-VA, but in negotiations MR agreed to do so on the condition that the government's focus would be on socio-economic issues and that no "community-related" issues (as arise in the complex Belgian federal system) or constitutional reform plans would be part of the cabinet programme.

== Policies and events ==
Despite three parties (all but N-VA) having been part of the preceding Di Rupo Government as well, the programme of this coalition differs substantially from the previous one. The emphasis is on socio-economic reforms, especially through austerity measures. Important goals for the parties include helping businesses become more competitive, and increasing job growth.

The announced measures were met by protests primarily from the labour unions, which argued that the measures favour employers and disproportionately burden employees and families. The unions, ACV/CSC, ABVV/FGTB and ACLVB/CGSLB, which play an important and institutionalised role in Belgium's political process, did not accept the government's offer for dialogue, maintaining that the government was not seriously inclined to reconsider any of the measures. Instead, the unions organised several regional and national strikes in November and December 2014, culminating in a one-day general strike on 15 December.

One of the federal executive's flagship measures was tax reform, or tax shift, aimed, among other things, at reducing the cost of labour. It took effect on 1 January 2016.

Following the 22 March 2016 attacks in Brussels, Interior Minister Jan Jambon and Justice Minister Koen Geens submitted their resignations. They were refused by the Prime Minister.

Another reform of the executive consists of increasing the age of retirement. It will thus increase from 65 to 66 in 2025 and from 66 to 67 in 2030 in order to finance the future cost of pensions. This measure, strongly criticized by the unions, provoked numerous strikes and demonstrations.

An often recurring subject was whether or not a capital gains tax should be introduced, together with a general tax reform. In the summer of 2017, the corporate gains tax was announced to be reduced from 33.99% to 29% starting 2018 and further down to 25% from 2020 whereas a capital gains tax of 0.15% on gains on financial securities was introduced for wealthier citizens holding accounts of at least 0.5 million Eur in value. Meanwhile the first 627 Eur of income through dividends became tax exempt.

Other measures taken by the government include the purchase of F-35s to replace the Belgian army's F-16s, the abandonment of nuclear power by 2025, the removal of abortion from the penal code and the launch of a public investment pact in cooperation with the private sector.

The government presided over the arrest of suspects who were accused of playing a role in the Paris attacks of November 2015, as well as a terrorist attack in Brussels in March 2016.

In December 2018, a political crisis emerged over whether to sign the Global Compact for Migration; N-VA was against whereas the other three parties supported it. On 4 December the Prime Minister of Belgium, Charles Michel, announced that the issue would be taken to parliament for a vote. On 5 December, parliament voted 106 to 36 in favor of backing the agreement. Michel stated that he would endorse the pact on behalf of the parliament, not on behalf of the divided government. Consequently, N-VA quit the government; the other three parties continue as a minority government (Michel II).

On 18 December 2018, Michel submitted the cabinet's resignation to the King, who accepted it on 21 December.

== Composition ==
The Constitution requires an equal number of Dutch- and French-speaking ministers (regardless of the Prime Minister). Since MR is the only French-speaking party, it has more ministers than it would otherwise get with its electoral weight; this is compensated by having only Dutch-speaking Secretaries of State.

Minister	Name	Party
Prime Minister	Charles Michel	MR
Deputy Prime Minister – Minister of the Interior, Safety and Director of buildings	Jan Jambon	N-VA
Deputy Prime Minister – Minister of Foreign Affairs	Didier Reynders	MR
Deputy Prime Minister – Minister of Employment, Economy, Consumer Affairs	Kris Peeters	CD&V
Deputy Prime Minister – Development Cooperation, Digital Agenda, Telecom and Postal Services	Alexander De Croo	Open Vld
Minister of the Middle Class, SMEs, Self-employed and Agriculture	Denis Ducarme	MR
Minister of Budget	Sophie Wilmès	MR
Minister of Energy	Marie-Christine Marghem	MR
Minister of Mobility	François Bellot	MR
Minister of Pensions	Daniel Bacquelaine	MR
Minister of Defence	Sander Loones	N-VA
Minister of Finance and fighting Fiscal Fraud	Johan Van Overtveldt	N-VA
Minister of Justice	Koen Geens	CD&V
Minister of Social Affairs and Health	Maggie De Block	Open Vld
Secretary of State	Name	Party
Secretary of State for Asylum, Migration and Administrative Simplification	Theo Francken	N-VA
Secretary of State for Equal Rights, Disabled Persons, Scientific Policy, Urban Policy and fighting Poverty	Zuhal Demir	N-VA
Secretary of State for Foreign Trade	Pieter De Crem	CD&V
Secretary of State for Social fraud, Privacy and the North Sea	Philippe De Backer	Open Vld

=== Changes in composition ===
- On 21 May 2015 the portfolios Urban Policy and fighting Fiscal Fraud were re-allocated between three N-VA members. Urban Policy moved from Jan Jambon to Elke Sleurs, while Sleurs handed over Fiscal Fraud to Johan Van Overtveldt.
- On 21 September 2015 it was announced that minister of Budget Hervé Jamar (MR) would resign to become governor of Liège. He was succeeded by Sophie Wilmès (MR).
- On 25 March 2016, in the aftermath of the March 2016 terrorist attacks in Brussels, Interior Minister Jan Jambon and Justice Minister Koen Geens both offered their resignation over their failure to detain one of the suspects, Ibrahim el-Bakraoui, despite warnings from Turkey's government in 2015. Michel rejected both resignations and the government's composition remained unchanged.
- On 15 April 2016, in the aftermath of the March 2016 terrorist attacks in Brussels, minister of mobility Jacqueline Galant (MR) resigned, after it became known that prior to the attacks she had received a summary of a damning European Commission report (2015) on security at Belgian airports. Two days later she was replaced by François Bellot.
- On 29 April 2016, Bart Tommelein (Open Vld) left his position as Secretary of State for Social fraud, Privacy and the North Sea to replace Annemie Turtelboom who had resigned earlier that same day as Flemish Minister for Finance, Budget and Energy in the Flemish Government. While Tommelein was replacing Turtelboom, he was himself replaced by Philippe De Backer who gave up his position as Member of the European Parliament.
- On 20 February 2017, Elke Sleurs (N-VA) announced she would leave her position as Secretary of State for Equal Rights, Disabled Persons, Scientific Policy, Urban Policy and fighting Poverty to become lijsttrekker in Ghent for the upcoming 2018 municipal elections. Three days later, the N-VA decided to replace Sleurs with Zuhal Demir. Demir was sworn in by the King on 24 February 2017.
- On 26 July 2017, Willy Borsus (MR) was appointed Minister-President of the Walloon Government, leaving his position as Minister of the Middle Class, SMEs, Self-employed and Agriculture, which was taken by Denis Ducarme.
- Following the Belgian local elections of October 2018, Minister of Defence Steven Vandeput was elected Mayor of Hasselt, a position he will be taking up as from 1 January 2019. Vandeput will therefore vacate his position in the federal government and on 2 November 2018, the N-VA nominated Sander Loones as his successor, with Loones already taking up the position on 12 November 2018.
- On 9 December 2018, King Philippe approved the resignation of 5 N-VA members of cabinet: three ministers, Jan Jambon, Johan Van Overtveldt and Sander Loones, and two state secretaries, Theo Francken and Zuhal Demir. Secretaries of state Pieter De Crem (CD&V) and Philippe De Backer (Open Vld) were appointed as ministers. The following portfolios were reattributed: Asylum and Migration to Maggie De Block, Interior to Pieter De Crem, Finance to Alexander De Croo, Telecommunications, Postal Services, Administrative Simplification and Digital Agenda to Philippe De Backer, Defence to Didier Reynders, Equal Rights, Disabled Persons and fighting Poverty to Kris Peeters, Scientific Policy and Civil Service to Sophie Wilmès, and Urban Policy to Denis Ducarme.
