= Michel Government =

The Michel Governments were various Belgian federal governments led by Prime Minister Charles Michel:

- Michel I Government (2014–2018)
- Michel II Government (2018–2019)
