= Wilmes =

Wilmes or Wilmès is the surname of the following people:

- Arlette Wilmes (born 1950), Luxembourgian swimmer
- Philippe Wilmès (1938–2010), Belgian banker and businessman
- Robert Wilmes (1928–2018), French politician and activist
- Sophie Wilmès (born 1975), Belgian politician and former Prime Minister of Belgium
