= Minister of the Interior (Belgium) =

This is the list of Belgian ministers of the Interior.

== List of ministers ==
=== 1831 to 1899 ===
year	minister	party
1831	Jean-François Tielemans	Liberale Partij
1831	Etienne de Sauvage	(liberaal)
1831	Charles de Brouckère	(liberaal)
1831	Théodore Teichmann	(liberaal)
1831	Isidore Fallon	Katholieke Partij
1831-1832	Barthélémy de Theux de Meylandt	(katholiek)
1832-1834	Charles Rogier	(liberaal)
1834-1840	Barthélémy de Theux de Meylandt	(katholiek)
1840-1841	Charles Liedts	(liberaal)
1841-1845	Jean-Baptiste Nothomb	(liberaal)
1845-1846	Sylvain Van de Weyer	(katholiek)
1846-1847	Barthélémy de Theux de Meylandt	(katholiek)
1847-1852	Charles Rogier	(liberaal)
1852-1855	Ferdinand Piercot	(liberaal)
1855-1857	Pierre de Decker	(katholiek)
1857-1861	Charles Rogier	(liberaal)
1861-1867	Alphonse Vandenpeereboom	(liberaal)
1868-1870	Eudore Pirmez	(liberaal)
1870-1871	Joseph Kervyn de Lettenhove	(Katholieke Partij)
1871-1878	Charles Delcour	(Katholieke Partij)
1878-1884	Gustave Rolin-Jaequemyns	(liberaal)
1884	Victor Jacobs	(Katholieke Partij)
1884-1887	Joseph Thonissen	(Katholieke Partij)
1887-1890	Joseph Devolder	(Katholieke Partij)
1890-1891	Ernest Mélot	(Katholieke Partij)
1891-1895	Jules de Burlet	(Katholieke Partij)
1895-1899	Frans Schollaert	(Katholieke Partij)

=== 1900 to 1999 ===
year	minister	party
1899 - 1907	Jules de Trooz	(Katholieke Partij)
1908 - 1910	Frans Schollaert	(Katholieke Partij)
1910 - 1918	Paul Berryer	(Katholieke Partij)
1918 - 1919	Charles de Broqueville	(Katholieke Partij)
1919 - 1920	Jules Renkin	(Katholieke Partij)
1920	Henri Jaspar	(Katholieke Partij)
1920 - 1921	Henri Carton de Wiart	(Katholieke Partij)
1921 - 1924	Paul Berryer	(Katholieke Partij)
1924 - 1925	Prosper Poullet	(Katholieke Partij)
1925 - 1926	Edouard Rolin Jaequemyns	(liberaal)
1926 - 1927	Henri Jaspar	(Katholieke Partij)
1927	Maurice Vauthier	(liberaal)
1927 - 1929	Albert Carnoy	(Katholieke Partij)
1929 - 1931	Henri Baels	(Katholieke Partij)
1931	Henri Jaspar	(Katholieke Partij)
1931 - 1932	Jules Renkin	(Katholieke Partij)
1932	Henri Carton de Tournai	(Katholieke Partij)
1932 - 1934	Prosper Poullet	(Katholieke Partij)
1934 - 1935	Hubert Pierlot	(Katholieke Partij)
1935 - 1936	Charles du Bus de Warnaffe	(Katholieke Partij)
1936 - 1937	August de Schryver	(Katholieke Partij)
1937 - 1938	Octave Dierckx	(liberaal)
1938 - 1939	Joseph Merlot	(POB)
1939	Willem Eekelers	(BWP)
1939 - 1940	Albert Devèze	(liberaal)
1940 - 1943	Arthur Vanderpoorten	(liberaal)
1943 - 1944	August de Schryver	(Katholieke Partij)
1944 - 1945	Edmond Ronse	(Katholieke Partij)
1945 - 1946	Adolphe Van Glabbeke	(liberaal)
1946	Joseph Merlot	(PSB)
1946 - 1947	Auguste Buisseret	(liberaal)
1947 - 1949	Piet Vermeylen	(BSP)
1949 - 1950	Albert de Vleeschauwer	(CVP)
1950 - 1952	Maurice Brasseur	(CVP)
1952 - 1954	Ludovic Moyersoen	(CVP)
1954 - 1958	Piet Vermeylen	(BSP)
1958	Charles Hèger	(PSC)
1958 - 1961	René Lefebvre	(liberaal)
1961 - 1965	Arthur Gilson	(PSC)
1965 - 1966	Alfons Vranckx	(BSP)
1966 - 1968	Herman Vanderpoorten	(PVV)
1968 - 1972	Lucien Harmegnies	(PSB)
1972 - 1973	Renaat Van Elslande	(CVP)
1973 - 1974	Edouard Close	(PSB)
1974	Charles Hanin	(PSC)
1974 - 1977	Joseph Michel	(PSC)
1977 - 1979	Rik Boel	(BSP)
1979 - 1980	Georges Gramme	(PSC)
1980	Philippe Moureaux	(PS)
1980 - 1981	Guy Mathot	(PS)
1981	Philippe Busquin	(PS)
1981 - 1986	Charles-Ferdinand Nothomb	(PSC)
1986 - 1988	Joseph Michel	(PSC)
1989 - 1995	Louis Tobback	SP
1995 - 1998	Johan Vande Lanotte	SP
1998	Louis Tobback	SP
1998 - 1999	Luc Van den Bossche	SP

=== 2000– ===
Portrait	Name (Born–Died)	Term of office			Political party	Government	Prime Minister
Portrait	Name (Born–Died)	Took office	Left office	Time in office	Political party	Government	Prime Minister
	Antoine Duquesne (born 1941 - died 2010)	12 July 1999	12 July 2003	4 years, 1 day	PRL; MR (since 2002)	Verhofstadt I	Guy Verhofstadt (Open VLD)
	Patrick Dewael (born 1955)	12 July 2003	30 December 2008	5 years, 172 days	Open VLD	Verhofstadt II	Guy Verhofstadt (Open VLD)
	Patrick Dewael (born 1955)	12 July 2003	30 December 2008	5 years, 172 days	Open VLD	Verhofstadt III	Guy Verhofstadt (Open VLD)
	Patrick Dewael (born 1955)	12 July 2003	30 December 2008	5 years, 172 days	Open VLD	Leterme I	Yves Leterme (CD&V)
	Guido De Padt (born 1954)	30 December 2008	17 July 2009	200 days	Open VLD	Van Rompuy	Herman Van Rompuy (CD&V)
	Annemie Turtelboom (born 1967)	17 July 2009	25 November 2009	2 years, 143 days	Open VLD	Van Rompuy	Herman Van Rompuy (CD&V)
	Annemie Turtelboom (born 1967)	25 November 2009	6 December 2011	2 years, 143 days	Open VLD	Leterme II	Yves Leterme (CD&V)
	Joëlle Milquet (born 1961)	6 December 2011	22 July 2014	2 years, 229 days	CDH	Di Rupo	Elio Di Rupo (PS)
	Melchior Wathelet, Jr. (born 1977)	22 July 2014	11 October 2014	82 days	CDH	Di Rupo	Elio Di Rupo (PS)
	Jan Jambon (born 1960)	11 October 2014	9 December 2018	4 years, 60 days	N-VA	Michel I	Charles Michel (MR)
	Pieter De Crem (born 1962)	9 December 2018	1 October 2020	1 year, 298 days	CD&V	Michel II	Charles Michel (MR)
	Pieter De Crem (born 1962)	9 December 2018	1 October 2020	1 year, 298 days	CD&V	Wilmès I	Sophie Wilmès (MR)
	Pieter De Crem (born 1962)	9 December 2018	1 October 2020	1 year, 298 days	CD&V	Wilmès II	Sophie Wilmès (MR)
	Annelies Verlinden (born 1978)	1 October 2020	3 February 2025	4 years, 126 days	CD&V	De Croo	Alexander De Croo (Open VLD)
	Bernard Quintin (born 1971)	3 February 2025	present	1 year, 223 days	MR	De Wever	Bart De Wever (N-VA)
