= Bernard Quintin =

Belgian politician (born 1971)

- Quintin in 2024

Minister of the Interior
- Incumbent
- Assumed office 3 February 2025
- Prime Minister: Bart De Wever
- Preceded by: Annelies Verlinden

Minister of Foreign Affairs
- In office 30 November 2024 – 3 February 2025
- Prime Minister: Alexander De Croo
- Preceded by: Hadja Lahbib
- Succeeded by: Maxime Prévot

Belgian Ambassador to Burundi
- In office 2016–2020

Belgian General Consul in Rio de Janeiro
- In office 2012–2016

Personal details
- Born: 1971 (age 54–55) Belgium
- Party: Reformist Movement (MR)
- Education: Université libre de Bruxelles
- Occupation: Diplomat • Politician

Bernard Quintin (French pronunciation: [bɛʁnaʁ kɛ̃tɛ̃]; born 1971) is a Belgian diplomat and politician who has been serving as Minister of the Interior in the De Wever Government since February 2025. Before that he has served as Minister of Foreign Affairs in the De Croo Government from November 2024 until February 2025.

== Early life ==
Bernard Quintin was born in 1971 in Belgium. He obtained a degree in medieval history from Université libre de Bruxelles. He taught for several years in Belgium and Mexico. After a few years, he obtained a master's degree in international relations.

== Career ==
Quintin joined the Belgian Ministry of Foreign Affairs in 2001. He has been posted in Warsaw, London, Kinshasa and at the Belgian Permanent Representation to the European Union. He served as consul general in Rio de Janeiro in 2012-2016 and ambassador of Belgium to Burundi from 2016 to 2019. Quintin was chief of staff to Minister Olivier Chastel in 2011-2012 and chief of staff to Minister of Foreign Affairs Philippe Goffin in 2019 and 2020.

He then served as deputy director general for Africa at the European External Action Service (EEAS). After three years, he returned to the Belgian Ministry to manage the Belgian Presidency of the Council of the European Union as acting director general for European affairs.

In November 2024, Quintin was nominated by the president of MR, Georges-Louis Bouchez, as minister of foreign affairs when the previous minister, Hadja Lahbib, left the role to become a European commissioner.
