= Lieve Wierinck =

Belgian politician (born 1957)

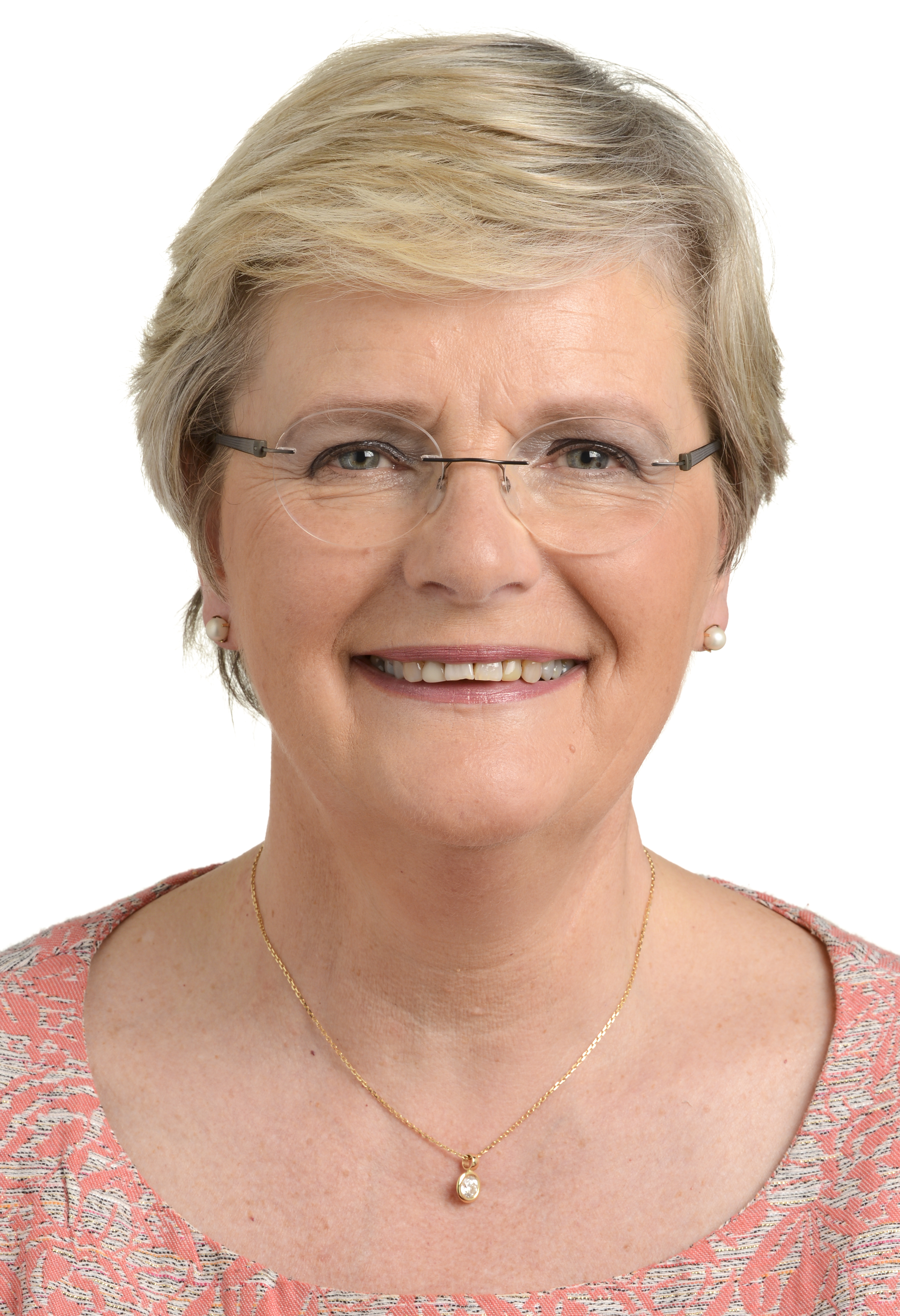

Member of the European Parliament
- In office 4 May 2016 – 2019

Personal details
- Born: 3 July 1957 (age 68) Leuven
- Party: Open Flemish Liberals and Democrats (Open Vld)

Godelieve Wierinck (born 3 July 1957 in Leuven) is a Belgian politician who served as Member of the European Parliament (MEP) for the Open Flemish Liberals and Democrats (Open Vld), which sits in the ALDE Group, from 2016 until 2019. She succeeded Philippe De Backer, who became Secretary of State in the Michel Government.

In the European Parliament, Wierinck was member of the Committee on Industry, Research and Energy (ITRE) and of the delegation for relations with the People's Republic of China. In 2019, Wierinick was the recipient of the Health Award at The Parliament Magazine's annual MEP Awards.

Wierinck was member of the Belgian Chamber of Representatives from 2011 to 2014. She is also active in local politics in Zaventem and has been chairwoman of the national VLD Women since 2015.
