= François Bellot =

Belgian politician (born 1954)

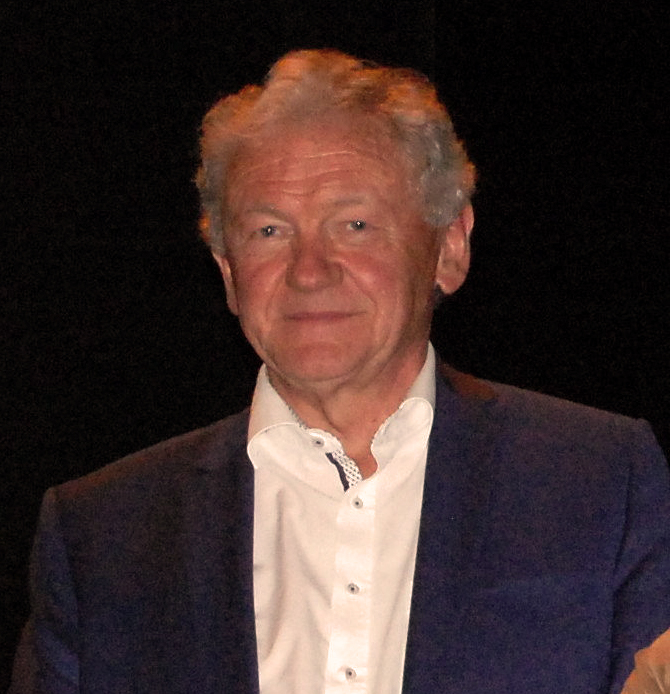

Minister of Mobility
- In office 18 April 2016 – 1 October 2020
- Prime Minister: Charles Michel; Sophie Wilmès
- Preceded by: Jacqueline Galant
- Succeeded by: Georges Gilkinet

Member of Chamber of Representatives
- Incumbent
- Assumed office December 19, 2000

Personal details
- Born: February 8, 1954 (age 72) Rochefort, Belgium
- Party: Reformist Movement
- Education: University of Liège; Université catholique de Louvain

François Bellot (born February 8, 1954, in Jemelle, Rochefort, Belgium) is a Belgian politician. He is a member of the Reformist Movement (MR) party. He served as the Federal Minister for Mobility and Transport in the Wilmès' caretaker Government from April 17, 2016, to October 1, 2020.

== Political functions ==
- City of Rochefort
  - CPAS Councillor of Rochefort (1982–1988)
  - City councillor (1989–1994)
  - Mayor of Rochefort (1995–1998, from 2001)
- Province of Namur
  - Provincial Councillor (1995–1997)
  - Permanent Deputy charged with Finances (1998–2000)
- Federal Representative (19 December 2000 – June 2010)
  - Member of the Committee of infrastructure and public companies (2000–2010)
  - Chairman of the infrastructure and public enterprises Committee (2007–2010)
  - Chairman of the Special Committee of rail safety after the Buizingen train accident (2009)
  - Rapporteur of the Special Committee on the Financial Crisis set up after the 2008 crisis
  - Member of the Monitoring Committee of military operations abroad
  - Commissioner of the Committee of inquiry into the bankruptcy of Sabena
- Senator (June 2010 – 2014)
  - Chairman of the MR group (2010–2012)
- Walloon MP (2014–2016)
  - Chairman of the Committee on Agriculture, tourism and sports infrastructure
- French Community MP (2014–2016)
  - Member of the Committee on Higher Education and the Media
- President of the Commission "Rural Life" of the Union of Towns and Municipalities
- Federal Minister for Mobility and Transport in the Michel Government and Wilmès Government (2016–2020)

== Awards ==
- Commander of the Order of Leopold since June 6, 2010
- Recipient of the Civic Decoration since February 6, 2008
- Commander of the Order of Leopold II since April 29, 2004
