= Marie-Christine Marghem =

Belgian politician (born 1963)

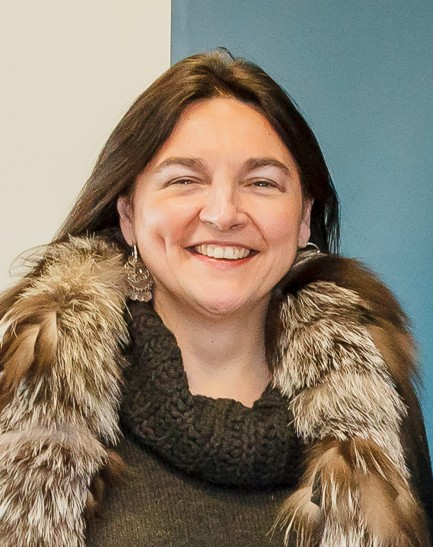

Minister of Energy, Environment and Sustainable Development
- In office 11 October 2014 – 1 October 2020
- Prime Minister: Charles Michel; Sophie Wilmès
- Preceded by: Catherine Fonck (Environment and Energy); Koen Geens (Sustainable Development)
- Succeeded by: Tinne Van der Straeten (Energy); Zakia Khattabi (Environment and Sustainable Development)

Member of Chamber of Representatives
- Incumbent
- Assumed office May 18, 2003

Personal details
- Born: May 22, 1963 (age 63) Tournai, Belgium
- Party: Reformist Movement; Citizens' Movement for Change
- Education: University of Liège

Marie-Christine E. F. Marghem (born 22 May 1963 in Tournai) is a Walloon Belgian politician. She served as Federal Minister of Energy, Environment and Sustainable Development in the Wilmès Government.

== Education ==
She received her degree of Law from the University of Liège. She soon after founded her own law firm in 1987.

== Political career ==
Marghem began her political career by appearing on the lists of the Christian Social Party (PSC) in the local elections of 1994 in Tournai. She was elected and became municipal councillor.

She then left the PSC when Gérard Deprez founded the Citizens' Movement for Change.

In the October 2006 local elections, she received 4840 preference votes, the highest score. As part of her parliamentary activities, Marghem stands out nationally for her work in the Commission on sexual abuse and the Commission related to the collapse of the Dexia bank.

In the October 2012 local elections, Marghem obtained 7911 votes. The MR gets 12 seats and Marghem becomes 1st deputy mayor under a majority agreement with the PSC. In the federal election of 25 May 2014, she was elected with more than 21 000 votes. On 11 October 2014, she took the oath before King Philip as Minister of Energy, Environment and Sustainable Development in the Michel Government. She has to manage the sensitive issue of energy transition. She is also the minister responsible for the Federal Institute for Sustainable Development.

In 2021 she became infamous for not following a request from the Federal Government. For over more than a year she needed to discuss the issue of the reversing counter for solar panels with the Flemish Government. However, no meetings were ever held ignoring the situation of half a million households.

== Offices held ==
- 1994–present: Municipal councillor for Tournai.
- 2000–2006: Alderman of Finance of Tournai
- 2006–2014: 1st deputy mayor, in charge of Planning and Urban Development
- 2014–2020: Minister of Energy, Environment and Sustainable Development in both the Michel Government and the Wilmès Government.
