= Chris Stone (footballer) =

Australian rules footballer and businessman (1964–2023)

Personal information
- Born: 24 February 1959
- Died: 24 November 2023 (aged 64)
- Original team: St Kilda City
- Height: 183 cm (6 ft 0 in)
- Weight: 80 kg (176 lb)
- Position: Rover

Playing career^{1}
Years	Club	Games (Goals)
1978–81	St Kilda	23 (12)
- ^{1} Playing statistics correct to the end of 1981.

Chris Stone (24 February 1959 – 24 November 2023) was an Australian businessman and Australian rules footballer. He was the husband of former Belgian prime minister Sophie Wilmès.

== Early life ==
Stone was from Sandy Bay, Tasmania, Australia. He played with St Kilda in the Victorian Football League (VFL).

== Business career ==
After leaving university, Stone began working with the Australian division of Pearl & Dean, a cinema advertising company. He moved to the UK in 1988 and in 1991 became regional sales director of Mills & Allen Outdoor. He transferred to Belgium in 1994 as CEO of Vivendi's Belgian division, comprising Belgoposter Outdoor, Claude Publicité. In 1998, Stone joined RMB International as chief operating officer (COO). He bought his own outdoor advertising company, Dewez, in 2001. From 2012 until his death he was president of the Belgian branch of Australian Business in Europe (ABIE).

== Personal life and death ==
Stone was married to Sophie Wilmès, the former foreign minister and former prime minister of Belgium.

Chris Stone died from brain cancer on 24 November 2023, at the age of 64.
