= Philippe Wilmès =

Belgian banker, businessman and professor

- Born: 4 March 1938; Etterbeek, Belgium
- Died: 24 May 2010 (aged 72); Grez-Doiceau, Belgium
- Education: Université libre de Bruxelles, Université catholique de Louvain
- Occupations: Professor; banker; businessman
- Children: Sophie Wilmès

Philippe Wilmès (4 March 1938 – 24 May 2010) was a Belgian banker, businessman, and professor.

== Early life ==
Wilmès was orphaned at a young age when his parents were killed in the bombing of Limal during World War II. He was raised by his grandparents in Luxembourg.

Wilmès joined the merchant marine to fund his interest in mountaineering, serving for seven years as a sailor and then as an officer. He also taught climbing at ADEPS, and subsequently studied law at the Université libre de Bruxelles (ULB) and Université catholique de Louvain (UCLouvain).

== Career ==
Wilmès worked at the Compagnie Maritime Belge for a period and then returned to UCLouvain as an assistant lecturer. He later spent a year at the Massachusetts Institute of Technology (MIT) and lectured in Great Britain and Canada. In 1975, he became chief of staff to Jean Gol, a member of the Liberal Reformist Party (PRL). He was a founding member of the Belgian businessclub Cercle de Lorraine.

Wilmès served periods as president of the Société Nationale d’Investissement and Société Fédérale d’Investissement. He became a regent of the National Bank of Belgium in 1992, and was also a director of Tractebel, Petrofina, Compagnie Nationale à Portefeuille, and Fluxys.

== Personal life ==
His daughter Sophie Wilmès became Belgium's first female prime minister.
