= Daniel Bacquelaine =

Belgian politician (born 1952)

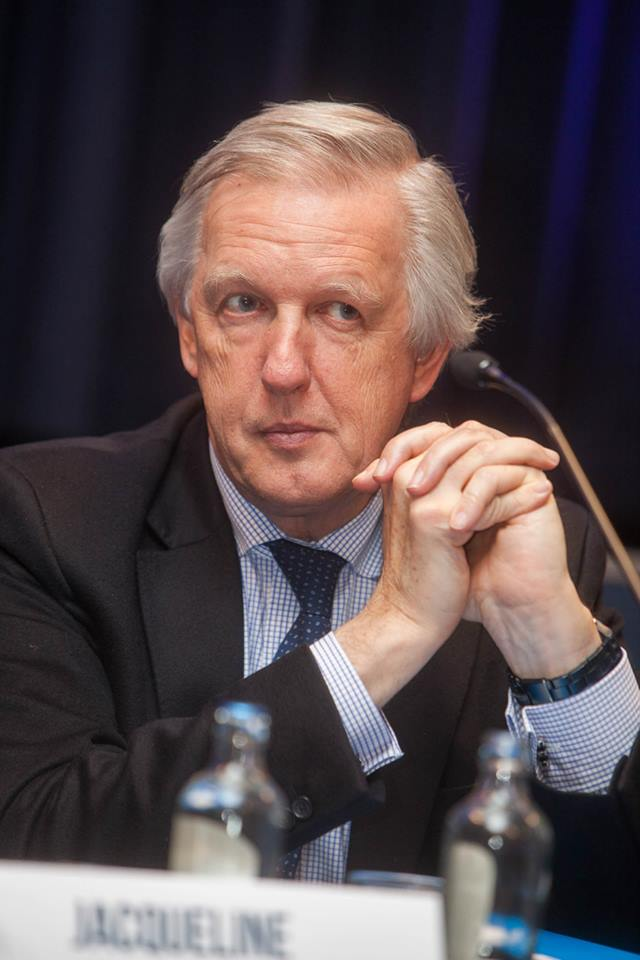
- Bacquelaine in 2014

Minister of Pensions
- In office 11 October 2014 – 1 October 2020
- Prime Minister: Charles Michel; Sophie Wilmès
- Preceded by: Alexander De Croo
- Succeeded by: Karine Lalieux

Member of Chamber of Representatives
- Incumbent
- Assumed office July 20, 1994
- Preceded by: Jean Gol

Personal details
- Born: October 30, 1952 (age 73) Liège, Belgium

Daniel Alain Marie Bacquelaine (French pronunciation: [danjɛl alɛ̃ maʁi baklɛn]; born 30 October 1952 in Liège, Belgium) is a Belgian Walloon politician. As a member of the Reformist Movement, he served as the Federal Minister for Pensions in the Michel Government and Wilmès Government and a member of parliament since 1994.

== Biography ==
After studying medicine at the University of Liège, Dr. Bacquelaine moved to Chaudfontaine as a general practitioner.

Meanwhile, he pursued a career in science as Master internship in general medicine. Author of numerous publications, he taught both in Belgium and abroad. He graduated in Mesotherapy at the University of Bordeaux.

Daniel Bacquelaine is also President of the Belgian Scientific Society of Mesotherapy. He also became Vice-President of the International Society of Mesotherapy between 1996 and 2003. He is a member of the Euro-Mediterranean Parliamentary Assembly and member of the Advisory Interparliamentary Council of Benelux.

In December 2010, he declared himself candidate for the leadership of the MR. In this election, he garnered nearly 46% of the vote.

== Political career ==
At university, he got involved in student liberal movements. By reactivating the Felu (Liberal Students Federation of Liège), he led the protests against reform plans of the two Ministers of National Education of the time, the French-speaking Antoine Humblet and Flemish Herman De Croo.

He began his political career as a municipal councillor in 1983 in Chaudfontaine. Re-elected in 1989, he became alderman of Finance, Sports and Thermal baths in 1989, before becoming mayor on 8 October 1992 and Vice President of the Conference of Mayors of the arrondissement of Liège.

He was successful in the municipal elections of 1994, 2000, 2006 and 2012.

He was also provincial councillor of Liège from 1988 to 1994, where he was PRL group leader from 1992 to 1994. During this period, he also chairs the Provincial Commission on Addiction Prevention.

Daniel Bacquelaine participated in the legislative elections of 24 November 1991 as a substitute. He entered the Chamber of Representatives on July 20, 1994 succeeding Jean Gol, who moved to the European Parliament. He was re-elected in the 1995, 1999, 2003, 2007, 2010 and 2014 elections. Following the elections of 13 June 1999, Daniel Bacquelaine became head of the PRL-FDF-MCC group, which would become the MR group in 2002, in the Chamber of Representatives.

On 10 May 2008, he became president of the MR party in the province of Liège.

In the federal elections of 25 May 2014, during which he led the MR list for the Chamber in the province of Liège, he gained the highest number of personal preference votes (46,230 votes) of all lists.

He quit as parliamentary group leader to become Federal Minister for Pensions, when the Michel Government was formed on 11 October 2014. He was replaced as group leader by Denis Ducarme.

== Honors ==
Daniel Bacquelaine is Knight of the Order of the Crown and Knight of the Order of Leopold.
