= Hervé Jamar =

Belgian politician

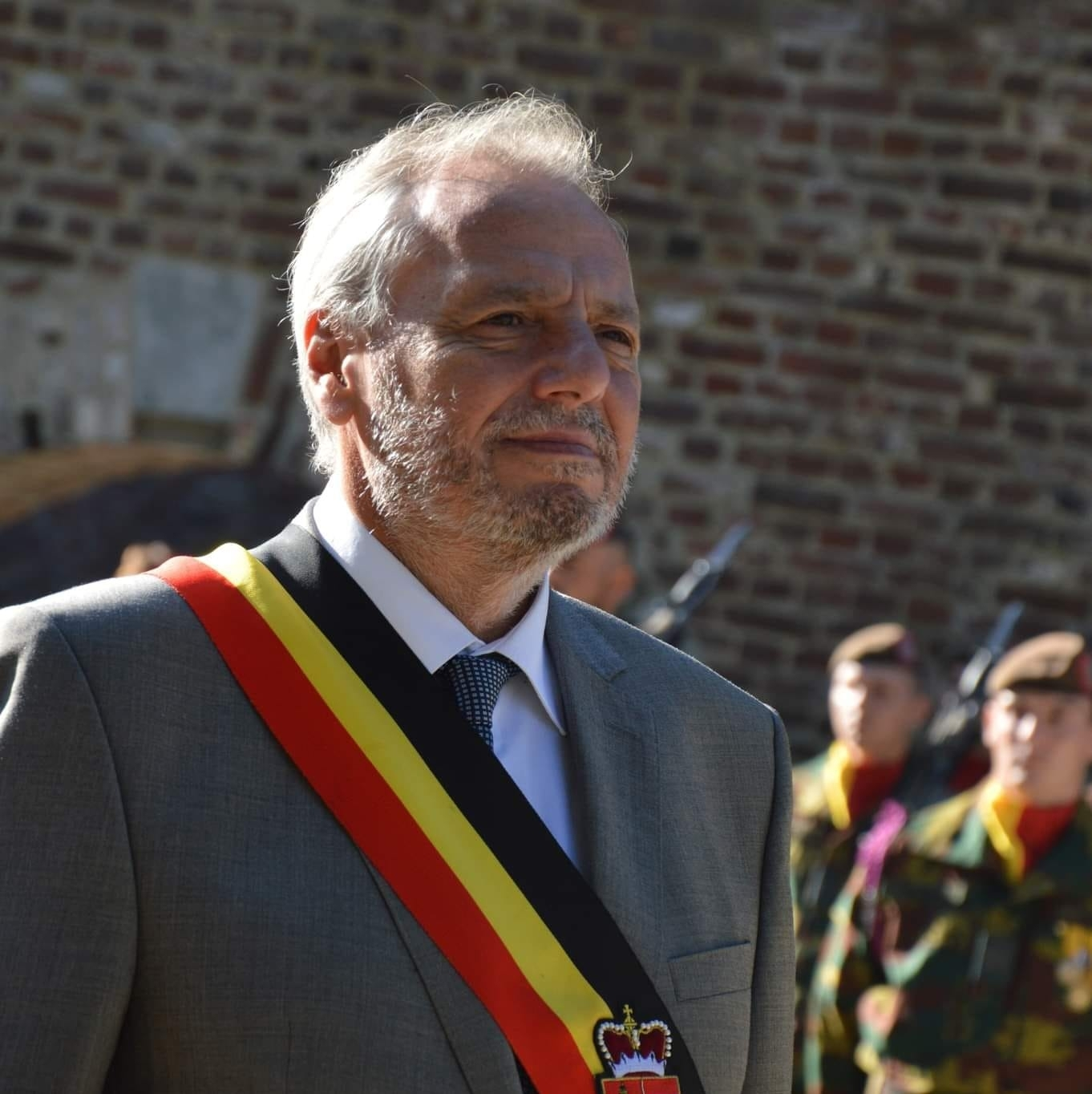

Minister of Budget
- In office 11 October 2014 – 21 September 2015
- Monarch: Philippe of Belgium
- Succeeded by: Sophie Wilmès

Hervé Jamar is a Belgian politician. He is a member of the Reformist Movement (MR). He was mayor of Hannut from 1995 to 2014. He became Belgium's Minister of Budget in 2014 but resigned in 2015 in order to become Governor of the Province of Liège.
