= Philippe De Backer =

Belgian politician (born 1978)

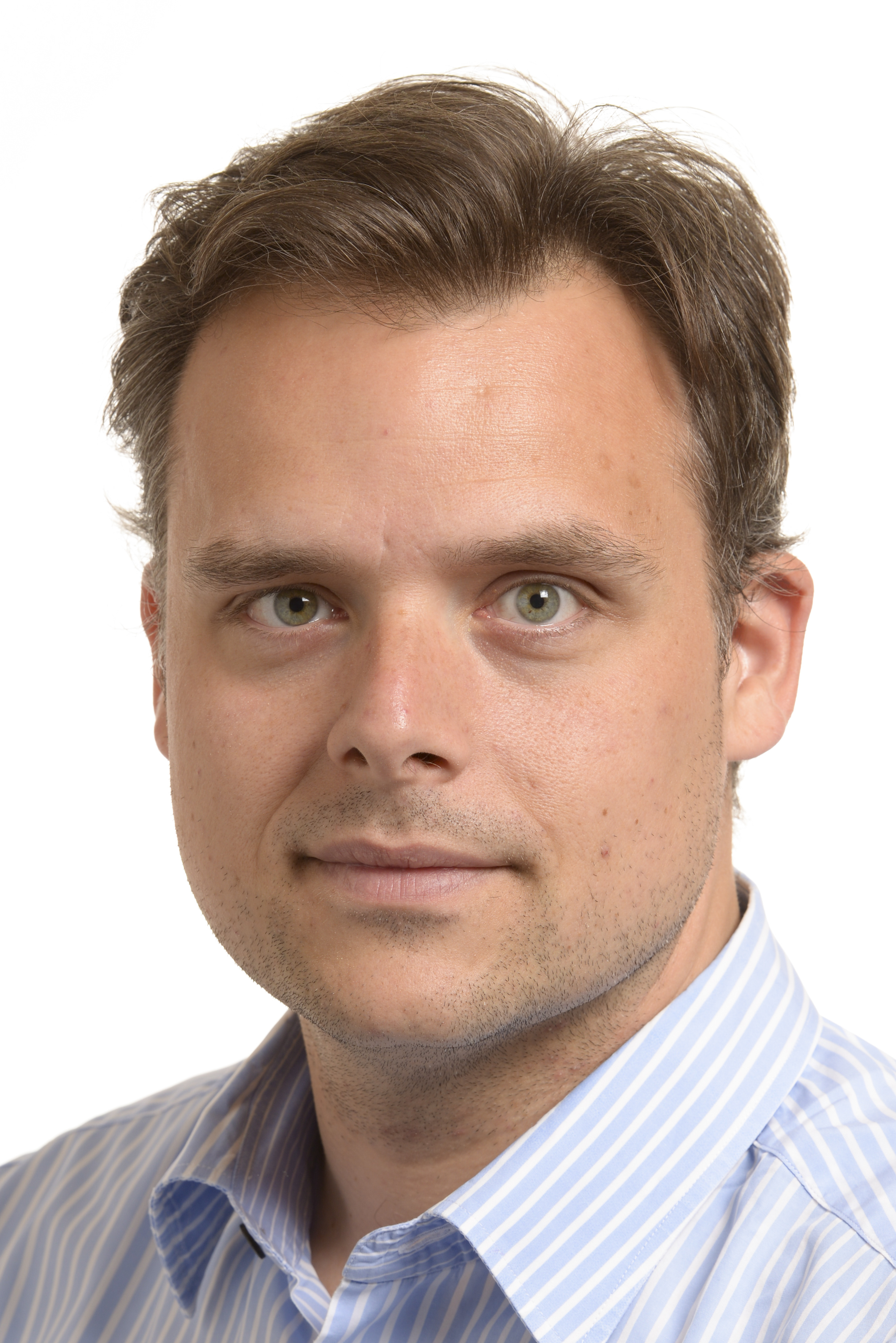

Secretary of State for Social Fraud, Privacy and the North Sea
- In office 29 April 2016 – 9 December 2018
- Prime Minister: Charles Michel
- Preceded by: Bart Tommelein

Member of the European Parliament
- In office September 2011 – April 2016
- Preceded by: Dirk Sterckx
- Succeeded by: Lieve Wierinck

Personal details
- Born: 4 December 1978 (age 47) Ekeren, Belgium
- Party: Open Vld
- Education: Ghent University
- Website: MEP Profile

Philippe De Backer (born 4 December 1978) is an Open Vld politician and was a Member of the European Parliament (MEP) from September 2011 until April 2016, when he became Secretary of State for Social Fraud, Privacy and the North Sea in the Michel Government.

== Biography ==
Philippe De Backer was born in Ekeren, Belgium and grew up in Kapellen. He studied biotechnology at Ghent University, where he earned a doctorate in 2009. During his student days, De Backer was active in the Liberal Flemish Students Association (LVSV) in Ghent and he was a core member of the liberal think tank Liberales. He was also elected for two years as a student representative in the Board of Directors of Ghent University. Afterwards, he worked for an investment fund specialized in healthcare.

From 2007 to 2010, De Backer was president of Jong VLD Nationaal, the youth section of Open Vld. In that period, he was also a member of the city council of Kapellen.

== Political career ==
From September 2011 onwards, De Backer was a member of the European Parliament. He succeeded his party colleague Dirk Sterckx. He is a member of the Alliance of Liberals and Democrats for Europe (ALDE), led by former Belgian Prime Minister Guy Verhofstadt. He dealt with the dossiers in the Transport Committee and the Economic and Monetary Affairs Committee. In 2014, he was appointed first successor at the European election list for Open Vld.

In addition to his committee assignments, De Backer is a member of the European Parliament Intergroup on Long Term Investment and Reindustrialisation and of the European Parliament Intergroup on LGBT Rights.

On 29 April 2016, Philippe De Backer was chosen to succeed Bart Tommelein as Secretary of State for Social fraud, Privacy and the North Sea in the Michel I Government. He was succeeded by Lieve Wierinck as Member of the European Parliament. When the Michel I Government fell, De Backer also became Minister of Administrative Simplification, Digital Agenda, Postal Services and Telecom in the Michel II Government.

On 24 January 2019, De Backer announced that he would quit politics, both locally and nationally, and return to business life as soon as a new government had taken office.
