= Sander Loones =

Belgian politician

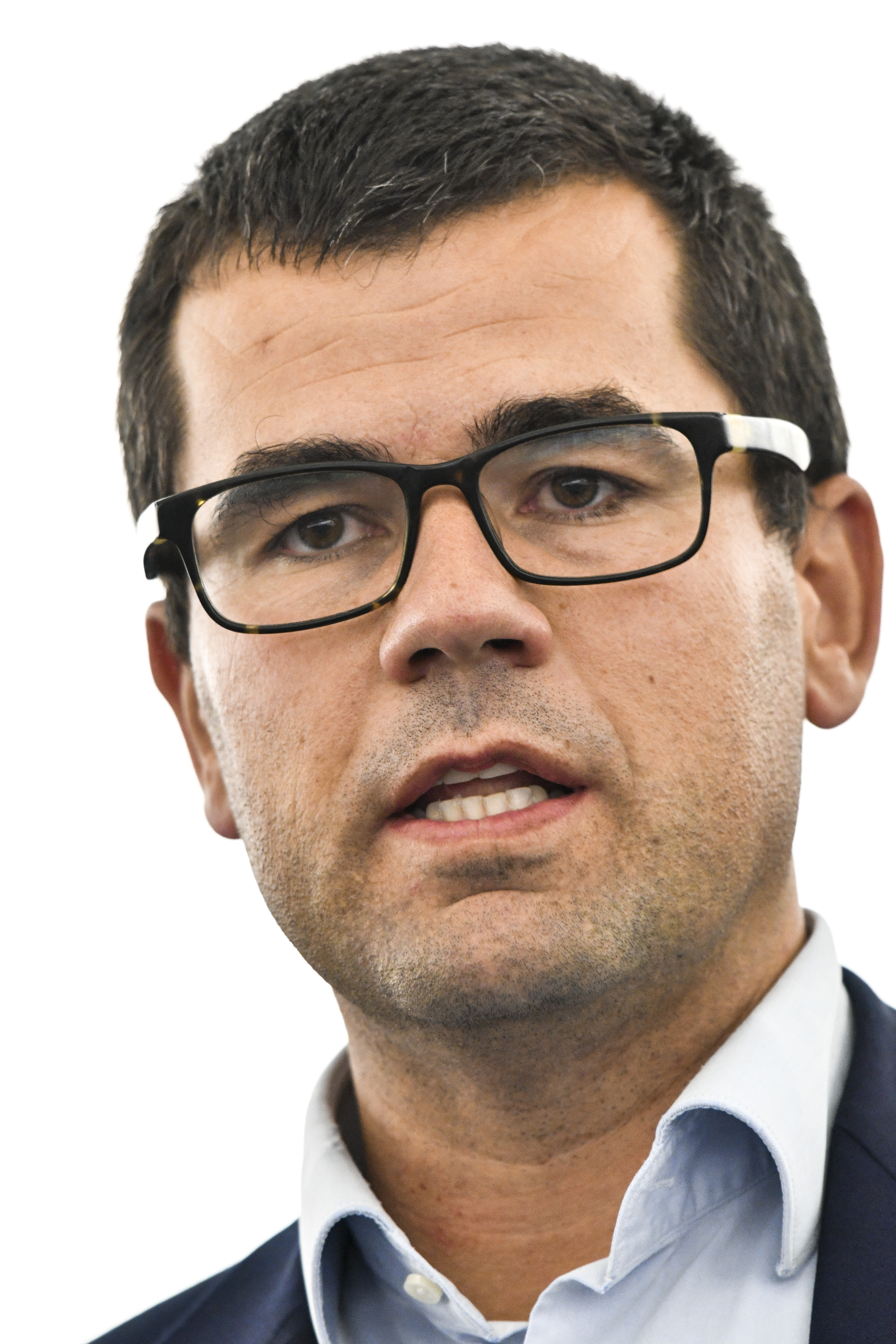
- Loones in 2016
- Born: January 26, 1979 (age 47); Veurne, Belgium
- Occupation: Politician
- Years active: 2014–present
- Website: https://www.sanderloones.be

Sander Loones (born 26 January 1979 in Veurne) is a Belgian politician.

== Career ==
From 2014 to 2018, he was a Member of the European Parliament (MEP) for the New Flemish Alliance (N-VA) - the Belgian delegation to the European Conservatives and Reformists Group. He was Vice Chair of the European Parliament Committee on Economic and Monetary Affairs from 8 January 2015. He was the Belgian Minister of Defence from 12 November 2018 to 8 December 2018. On 12 November 2018, he succeeded Steven Vandeput as Minister of Defence.

Political offices
Preceded by Steven Vandeput	Minister of Defence; 2018	Succeeded by Didier Reynders
