= Maggie De Block =

Flemish politician (born 1962)

Maggie Celine Louise De Block
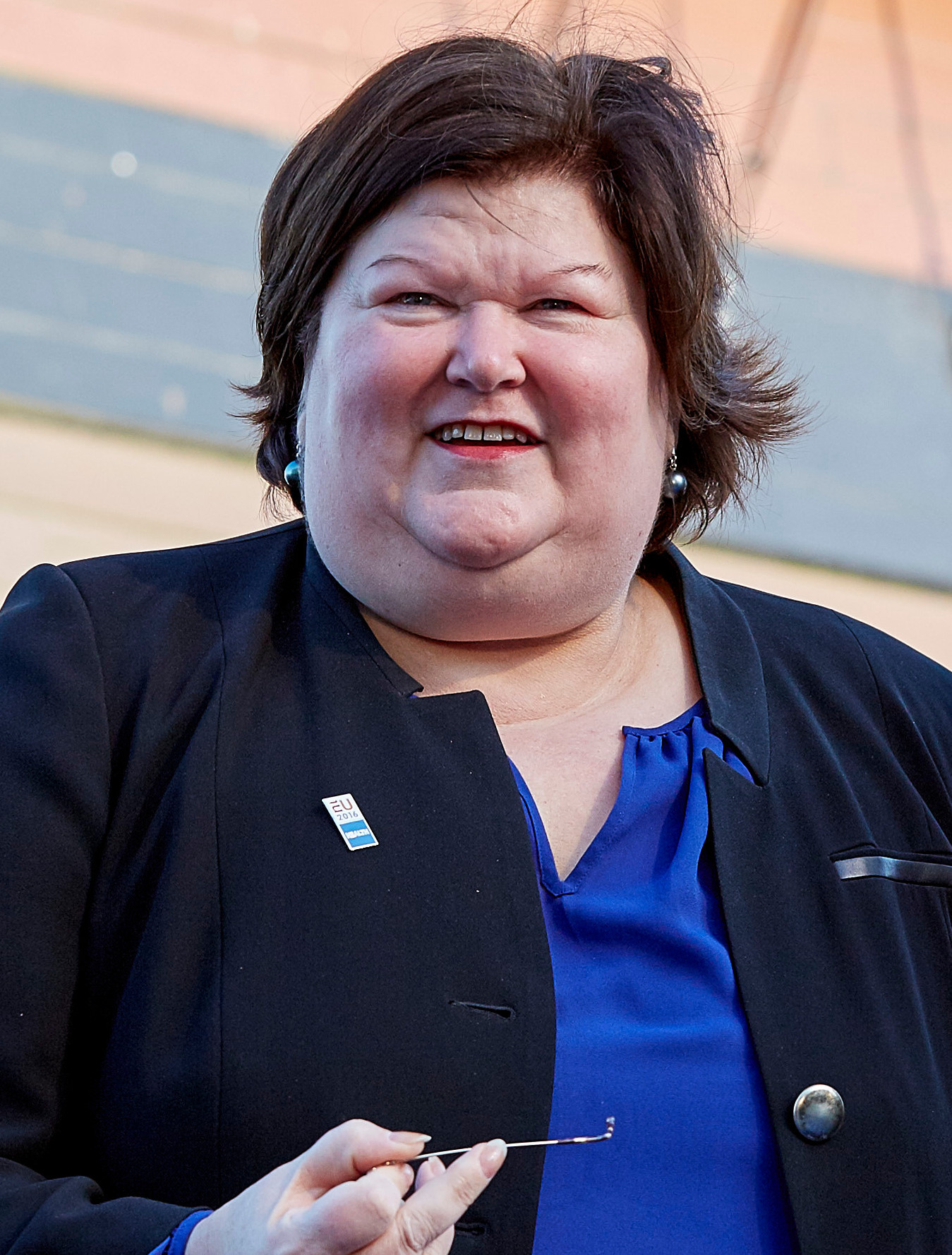

Minister of Health and Social Affairs
- In office 11 October 2014 – 1 October 2020
- Prime Minister: Charles Michel; Sophie Wilmès
- Preceded by: Laurette Onkelinx
- Succeeded by: Frank Vandenbroucke

Minister of Justice
- In office 25 July 2014 – 11 October 2014
- Prime Minister: Elio Di Rupo
- Preceded by: Annemie Turtelboom
- Succeeded by: Koen Geens

State Secretary of Asylum, Migration, Social Integration, and Poverty Reduction
- In office 6 December 2011 – 11 October 2014
- Prime Minister: Elio Di Rupo
- Preceded by: Melchior Wathelet (Asylum and Migration); Philippe Courard (Social Integration and Poverty Reduction)
- Succeeded by: Theo Francken (Asylum, Migration, and Reduction of Administrative Burden); Elke Sleurs (Poverty Reduction, Fraud Combat, and Science Policy)

Minister of Asylum and Migration
- In office 9 December 2018 – 1 October 2020
- Prime Minister: Charles Michel; Sophie Wilmès
- Preceded by: Theo Francken (As State Secretary of Asylum, Migration, and Reduction of Administrative Burden)

Personal details
- Born: 28 April 1962 (age 64) Merchtem, Belgium
- Party: Anders (2007–present); VLD (1999–2007)
- Education: Vrije Universiteit Brussel

Maggie Celine Louise De Block (Flemish: [ˈmɛɣi seːˈlin(ə) luˈʋizə də ˈblɔk]; born 28 April 1962) is a Belgian politician. A member of Anders (formerly Open Flemish Liberals and Democrats), she has chaired her party's group in the Chamber of Representatives since 2020.

De Block served as minister of social affairs and health in the governments of prime ministers Charles Michel and Sophie Wilmès from 2014 until 2020. Following a reshuffle on 9 December 2018 to prevent the government's collapse, she additionally resumed responsibility for Asylum and Migration.

== Early life and career ==
Maggie Celine Louise De Block was born in Merchtem, Province of Brabant (later Flemish Brabant) on 28 April 1962.

De Block went to the former secondary school Koninklijk Lyceum (now Lyceum Martha Somers Brussel) in Laeken. After her graduation, she studied medicine at the Vrije Universiteit Brussel. While a student in 1982, De Block married Luc Asselman. They have two children. She graduated as a family doctor.

== Political career ==
=== Member of Parliament, 1999–2011 ===
In 1999, De Block nominated herself for the federal election as member of the liberal party Vlaamse Liberalen en Democraten also known as VLD. During the elections, she was elected as a Member of the Belgian Chamber of Representatives for the electoral district Brussels-Halle-Vilvoorde.

=== Early career in government, 2011–2014 ===
Four years after the election she became Secretary of the Chamber of Representatives for four years. In 2010, De Block also became Chairman of the Infrastructure Committee until the following year. De Block was chosen to become Secretary of State for Asylum, Immigration, and Social Integration in the newly Di Rupo Government which would be formed in December 2011. On 6 December, she becomes Secretary of State for Asylum, Immigration, and Social Integration and part of the Federal Government.

In December 2012, De Block became the vice-chair of the Open VLD party. In March 2013, she was voted woman of the year by readers of the francophone newspaper La Libre Belgique. In 2013, and 2014 polls, she became the most popular Flemish politician, ahead of the minister-president of Flanders Kris Peeters.

De Block became minister of justice charged with asylum, immigration, social integration, and poverty reduction in the Di Rupo Government in July 2014.

=== Minister of Health, 2014–2020 ===
In the government of Prime Minister Charles Michel formed in October 2014, De Block became minister of social affairs and health. When taking the oath, she described the portfolio as "her dream". Critics have said that she does not set the right example as health minister due to her obesity, and she has answered that "I know I'm not a model but you have to see what's inside, not the packaging".

During her time as minister, De Block was involved in coordinating the Belgian response to the Ebola virus epidemic in West Africa. In 2015, she led a joint effort of Belgium and the Netherlands to negotiate the purchase of remedies for rare diseases with pharmaceutical groups. In June 2015, she signed a royal decree legalising certain uses of medical cannabis, which at the time only included Sativex oral spray for multiple sclerosis.

By 2015, De Block was the most popular politician in Flanders, Wallonia and Brussels, making her the most popular politician in Belgium.

In 2018, under De Block's orders as health minister, the strategic reserves of FFP2 masks were destroyed due to them being out of date and they were not replenished. She claimed she did not replenish them to save taxpayer money. This decision came under fire during the COVID-19 pandemic when the shortage of masks contributed to making Belgium one of the hardest-hit countries.

In September 2018, De Block decided to introduce plain packaging for all tobacco products in Belgium.

On 9 December 2018, it was announced that De Block would be responsible again for asylum and migration, replacing Theo Francken. She held the post in a previous government. Her official title in the caretaker Michel II government and in the succeeding Wilmès government was minister of social affairs and public health, and asylum policy and migration.

During the early phase of the COVID-19 pandemic in Belgium, De Block oversaw the government's response. In May 2020, she called on European Union countries to be "united" in the distribution of protective face masks. By July 2020, she publicly cited the lack of greater coordination with Belgium's neighbours – France, Germany and the Netherlands – as a "big concern".

De Block was not re-appointed to the government led by Alexander De Croo and instead became a regular member of the Belgian Parliament again.

== Other activities ==
In 2020, De Block was appointed by the World Health Organization's Regional Office for Europe to serve as a member of the Pan-European Commission on Health and Sustainable Development, chaired by Mario Monti.

Also since 2020, De Block has been an alternate member of the Global Leaders Group on Antimicrobial Resistance, co-chaired by Sheikh Hasina and Mia Mottley. She also joined the WHO's Technical Advisory Group (TAG) for One Health.

== Honours ==
- Belgium: Commander in the Order of Leopold II

Political offices
Preceded by Annemie Turtelboom	Minister of Justice; 2014	Succeeded by Koen Geens
Preceded by Laurette Onkelinx	Minister of Social Affairs and Health; 2014–2020	Succeeded by Frank Vandenbroucke
