= Jean Gol =

Belgian politician (1942–1995)

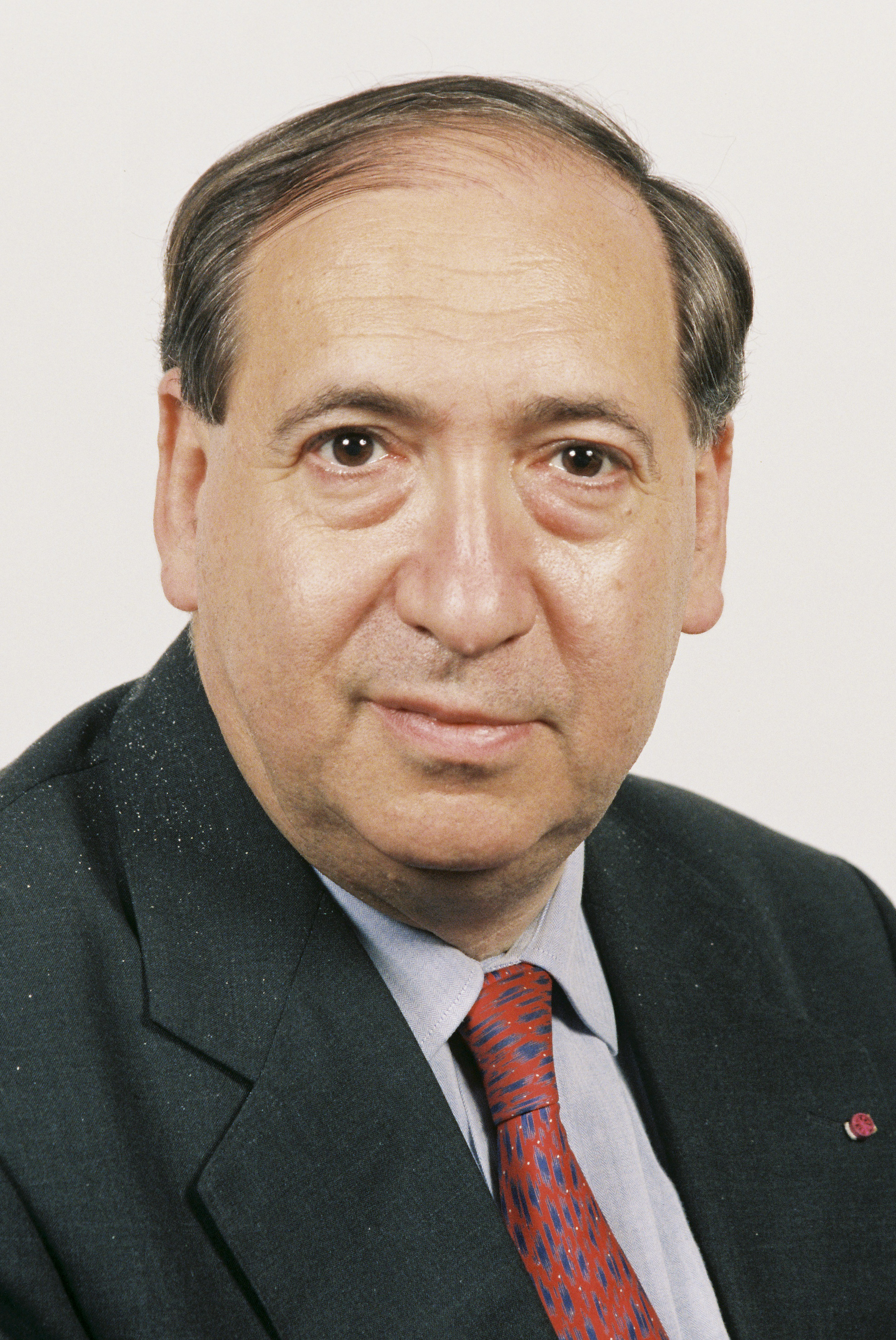
- Born: 8 February 1942; Hammersmith, United Kingdom
- Died: 18 September 1995 (aged 53); Liège, Belgium
- Occupation: Politician

Jean Gol (French pronunciation: [ʒɑ̃ ɡɔl]; 8 February 1942 – 18 September 1995) was a Belgian politician for the liberal Walloon party Parti Réformateur Libéral (PRL). He was a minister, on several occasions, in the Belgian government, including service as Deputy Prime Minister.

== Early life ==
Jean Gol was born to Ashkenazi Jewish émigrés (of Polish-Jewish and Lithuanian-Jewish origins). His father, Stanislas Gol (1908–1976), born in Warsaw, and Léa Karny (1911–2001), born in Liège to parents born in present-day Lithuania (then Russian Empire), were both medical doctors with diplomas from the University of Liège. After the Nazi invasion of Belgium in 1940, the Karny family and their stepsons took refuge in England, via France, Algeria, Morocco and Portugal. Stanislas Gol enlisted in the Belgian Army in the United Kingdom, and Léa gave birth to Jean in exile. The family returned to Belgium in 1945, but Léa's parents, Coussel Karny (1883–1944), and Yocheved Chamech (1886–1944), had gone back to Liège in December 1940, and had been deported to Auschwitz concentration camp in July 1944, and didn't survive deportation.

After the Second World War, Gol grew up in Belgium and studied law. He obtained a doctorate in law at the University of Liège.

== Political career ==
He cofounded in 1964 with François Perin the Parti wallon des travailleurs (PWT) and the Parti Wallon in 1965. Then, in 1968, they both split to form the Parti wallon, and Gol was elected on a larger regionalist ticket, the Rassemblement Wallon (Walloon Rally), a few weeks later for the 1968 Belgian general election on 31 March 1968.

=== Public offices ===
In 1974, he was Secrétaire d'État à l'Economie régionale wallonne in the government Tindemans II. In 1976, he was one of the co-founders of the Parti des Réformes et des Libertés de Wallonie (PRLW), a merger of the liberal Walloon PLP, and some dissidents of the Rassemblement Wallon. During the governments Martens V-VII, of 17 December 1981 up to 9 May 1988, he was: vice-premier, minister of justice and institutional reform. From 6 January 1985, up to 28 November 1985, Jean Gol replaced Willy De Clercq on the department of foreign trade.

In June 1994, he was elected a member of the European Parliament, and in addition was elected as a member of the Belgian Senate in 1995.

=== Leadership within Francophone circles ===
Over a long period he was noted for his ability to empathize with local Walloon and Liégeois leaders from diverse political backgrounds, including with veteran Walloon Socialist André Cools; out of these efforts emerged what became known as the 'Colonster' group, which partly proved to be the catalyst for a strengthening of collective Francophone responses by way of counterweight to the increasing influence of Flemish-based parties in Belgium.

In May 1992, he became president of the PRL, and in 1993, he was one of the architects of the PRL-FDF Federation, in collaboration with Antoinette Spaak.

=== Contribution to political theory ===
He re-defined the doctrine of social liberalism, which he had already worked on in 1976.

Jean Gol has voiced his support for Rattachism.

== Death ==
He died of a sudden illness in 1995. He was succeeded as leader of the PRL by his longstanding party colleague Louis Michel.

In September 2025, Gol's grave was vandalized with anti-Semitic messages.

== Honours ==
He received the following honorific distinctions

- Belgium: Grand Officier of the Order of Leopold
- France: Grand Officer of the Legion of Honour
- Italy: Knight Grand Cross of the Order of Merit of the Italian Republic
- Spain: Grand Cross of Order of Isabella the Catholic
- Portugal: Grand Cross of the Order of Christ
- Mexico: Grand Cross of the Order of the Aztec Eagle
- Rwanda: Umurinzi Medal

== See also ==
- Philippe Wilmès, chef de cabinet from 1975

== Sources ==
- Centre Jean Gol
- Liberaal Archief
