= Philippe Goffin =

Belgian politician (born 1967)

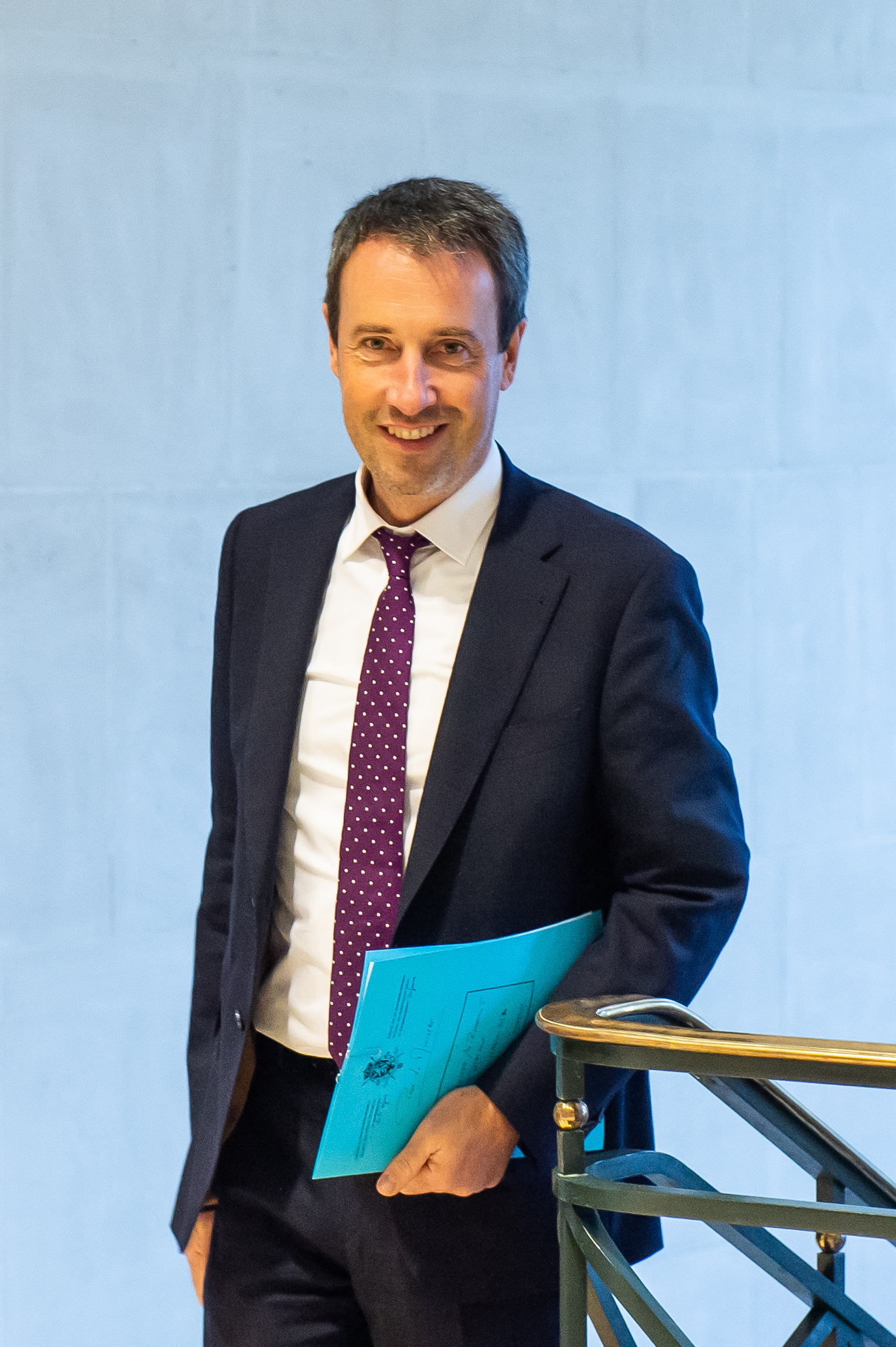

Minister of Foreign Affairs Minister of Defence
- In office 30 November 2019 – 1 October 2020
- Prime Minister: Sophie Wilmès
- Preceded by: Didier Reynders
- Succeeded by: Sophie Wilmès (Foreign Affairs); Ludivine Dedonder (Defense)

Personal details
- Born: 1 April 1967 (age 59) Rocourt, Belgium
- Party: Reformist Movement
- Education: Université catholique de Louvain

Philippe Goffin (French pronunciation: [filip ɡɔfɛ̃]; born 1 April 1967) is a Belgian politician who served as Minister of Foreign Affairs and Minister of Defence from November 2019 to October 2020 under Prime Minister Sophie Wilmès.

== Political career ==
In the federal elections of 26 May 2019, Goffin ran in Liège Province, in 3rd place on the Reformist Movement (MR) list led by Daniel Bacquelaine. He was re-elected to the House with 14,717 votes. On 12 November 2019, following the departure of Charles Michel from the presidency of the MR, Goffin stood in the internal elections of the party but failed in the first round.

On 30 November 2019, he entered the federal government as Minister of Foreign Affairs and Minister of Defence, replacing Didier Reynders, who became a member of the European Commission headed by Ursula von der Leyen, holding the Justice portfolio. In August 2020, Goffin said he welcomed the Israel–United Arab Emirates normalization agreement as a step toward a peaceful Middle East and added that the suspension of the proposed Israeli annexation of the West Bank must be followed up with the two-state solution.
