= Didier Reynders =

Belgian politician (born 1958)

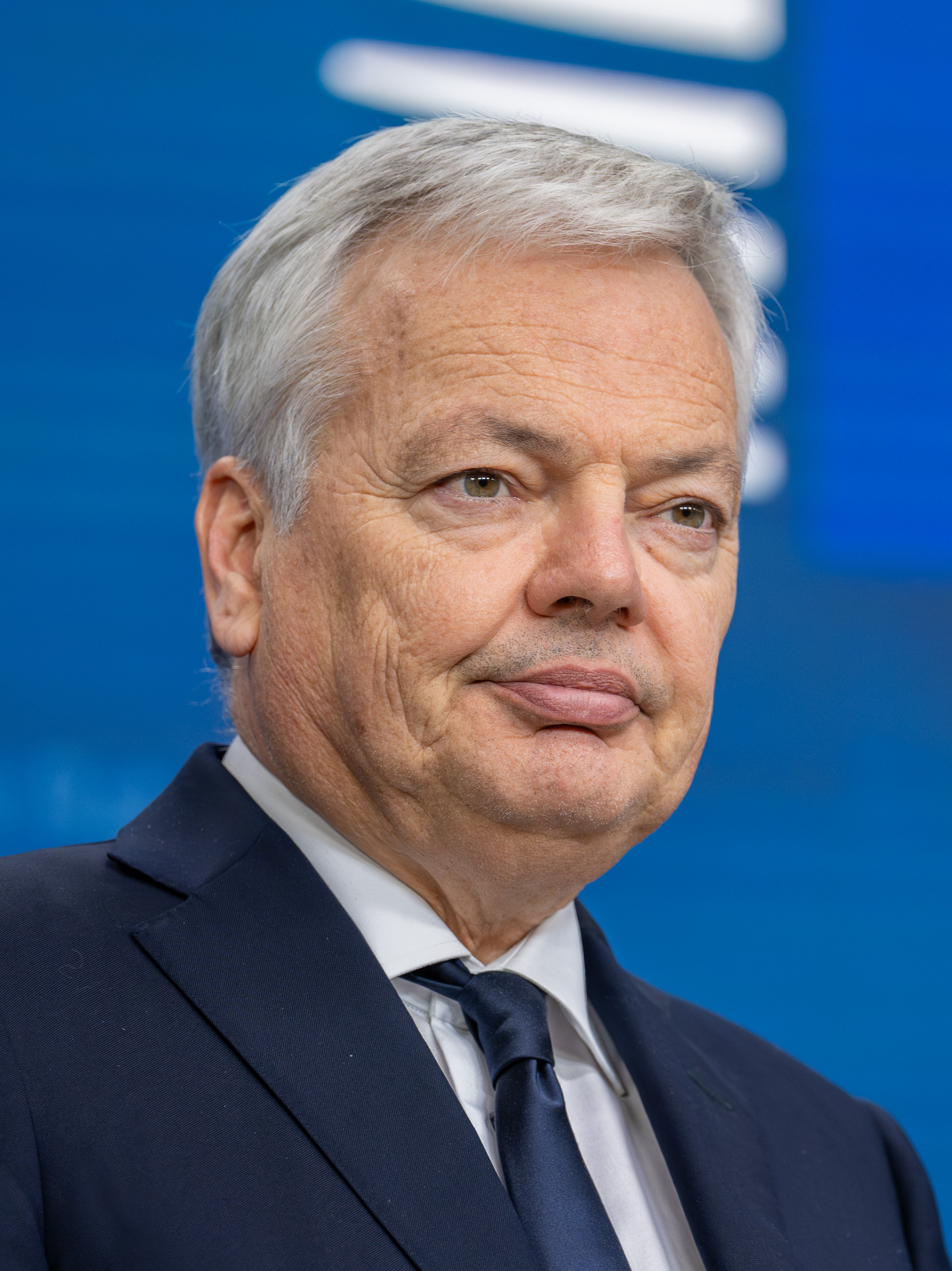
- Reynders in 2024

European Commissioner for Justice
- In office 1 December 2019 – 30 November 2024 (Note: Věra Jourová served as acting commissioner during Reynders's leave between 15 April – 25 June 2024.)
- Commission: Von der Leyen I
- Preceded by: Věra Jourová
- Succeeded by: Michael McGrath

Minister of Foreign Affairs
- In office 6 December 2011 – 30 November 2019
- Prime Minister: Elio Di Rupo; Charles Michel; Sophie Wilmès
- Preceded by: Steven Vanackere
- Succeeded by: Philippe Goffin

Minister of Defence
- In office 9 December 2018 – 30 November 2019
- Prime Minister: Charles Michel; Sophie Wilmès
- Preceded by: Sander Loones
- Succeeded by: Philippe Goffin

Minister of Finance
- In office 12 July 1999 – 6 December 2011
- Prime Minister: Guy Verhofstadt; Yves Leterme; Herman Van Rompuy; Yves Leterme
- Preceded by: Jean-Jacques Viseur
- Succeeded by: Steven Vanackere

Personal details
- Born: 6 August 1958 (age 67) Liège, Belgium
- Party: Reformist Movement
- Other political affiliations: Alliance of Liberals and Democrats for Europe Party (Renew Europe)
- Education: University of Liège

Didier Reynders (French: [didje ʁɛndɛʁs]; born 6 August 1958) is a Belgian politician of the Reformist Movement (MR) who served as European Commissioner for Justice in the first Von der Leyen Commission from 2019 to 2024. He held various positions in public institutions before becoming a member of the House in 1992. Until his appointment to the European Commission, Reynders had been a minister continuously since 1999.

He served as Federal Minister of Finance until December 2011 in six different governments, then became Federal Minister for Foreign Affairs, later for Trade, Foreign Affairs, and European Affairs in two consecutive governments. Following the government crisis of December 2018, he was also appointed to the post of Minister of Defense which he held until November 2019.

== Early life and education ==
Reynders was born in Liège as the youngest in a family with three children. He studied law at the University of Liège.

== Early career ==
Didier Reynders began his career as a lawyer in 1981 before serving as Chairman of the National Railway Company of Belgium from 1986 to 1991.

== Political career ==
=== Minister of Finance (1999–2011) ===
Reynders served as Minister of Finance from 1999 to 2011; in 2002, he chaired the G-10 which is the meeting of the main creditor states (Belgium, Canada, France, Germany, Italy, Japan, the Netherlands, Sweden, Switzerland, the United Kingdom and the United States).

In 2004 Reynders became Deputy Prime Minister in the government of Prime Minister Guy Verhofstadt. He was the chairman of the Mouvement Réformateur from 2004 to 2011.

Didier Reynders led the MR to a victory in the 2007 general elections when the MR became the largest Francophone party of Belgium. The King appointed Reynders as informateur, i.e. to start off the informal coalition talks for a new federal government.

Stalemate followed the 2010 general election. The King appointed a succession of people to negotiate a coalition from June 2010 onwards, but none succeeded in the task of forming a new government during the following seven months. Reynders was appointed informateur by the King on 2 February 2011. He reported on 16 February 2011, and his brief was extended through 1 March 2011.

=== Minister of Foreign Affairs (2011–2019) ===
Following the appointment of Elio Di Rupo as new Belgian Prime Minister in December 2011, Reynders became Minister of Foreign Affairs. During his tenure, Belgium was elected as a non-permanent member of the United Nations Security Council (2019–2020), as well as of the United Nations Human Rights Council (2016–2018).

=== Minister of Defence (2018–2019) ===
After the ruling coalition collapsed in 2019, Reynders also held responsibility for the defense portfolio. Following an inconclusive election in May 2019, King Philippe asked Reynders and Johan Vande Lanotte to look into the conditions required for forming a coalition government.

In 2019, Reynders announced his candidacy to succeed Thorbjørn Jagland as Secretary General of the Council of Europe; the position instead went to Marija Pejčinović Burić.

=== European Commissioner for Justice (2019–2024) ===
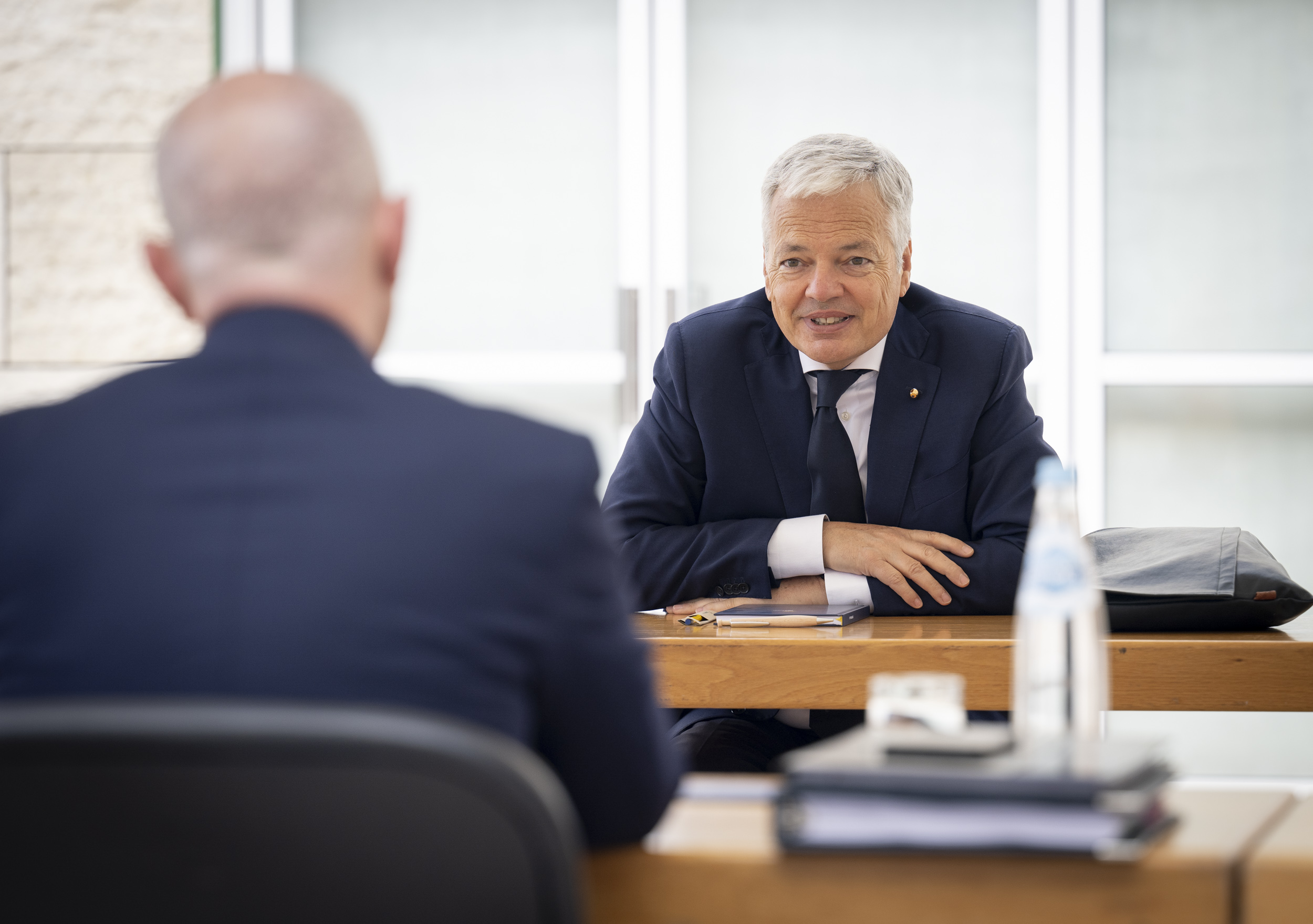
Reynders meets with U.S. Homeland Security Secretary Alejandro Mayorkas in a bilateral meeting in Lisbon, 22 June 2021.

In the summer of 2019, Belgian Prime Minister Charles Michel put Reynders forward as the Belgian nominee for the incoming European Commission. President-elect Ursula von der Leyen nominated him for the Justice portfolio. Reynders' hearing at the European Parliament was held in September 2019 and his nomination was approved by a large majority. He took office on 1 December 2019.

In 2020, Reynders announced plans to develop a legislative proposal by 2021 requiring businesses to carry out due diligence in relation to the potential human rights and environmental impacts of their operations and supply chains.

A 2022 report stated that Reynders was one of at least five senior EU officials targeted by Israeli spyware in 2021.

In September 2023, Reynders was temporarily assigned by von der Leyen the European Commission's competition portfolio following outgoing European Commissioner for Competition Margrethe Vestager’s announcement that she was officially a candidate for the presidency of the European Investment Bank.

In January 2024, Reynders again became the Belgian government's candidate for the position as Secretary General of the Council of Europe, this time competing with Alain Berset and Indrek Saar. Berset won the vote by the Parliamentary Assembly of the Council of Europe on 25 June 2024 with 114 votes to 46 votes for Reynders and 85 for Saar.

In September 2024, the Belgian Government appointed Hadja Lahbib to succeed Reynders as the Belgian Commissioner in the European Commission, formally ending Reynders's tenure in the Von der Leyen's Commission.

== Other activities ==
=== International organisations ===
- African Development Bank (AfDB), Ex-Officio Member of the Board of Governors (1999–2011)
- Asian Development Bank (ADB), Ex-Officio Member of the Board of Governors (1999–2011)
- European Bank for Reconstruction and Development (EBRD), Ex-Officio Member of the Board of Governors (1999–2011)

=== Non-profit organisations ===
- European Council on Foreign Relations (ECFR), Member

== Controversies ==
=== Political activities ===
In 2015, Reynders drew criticism for having his face painted black during a traditional festival in Brussels.

In April 2017, Belgium voted in favour of the entry of Saudi Arabia, yet considered one of the most retrograde countries on the issue of women's rights, in the United Nations Commission on the Status of Women. This decision raised controversy and questions about the role of Reynders.

=== Criminal investigation ===
In September 2019, Belgian police investigated allegations of corruption and money-laundering against Reynders, relating to the construction of the Belgian embassy building in Kinshasa, the lease of a federal police HQ and other matters. The investigation was dropped soon after. In December 2024, another investigation was opened into "possible money laundering practices" related to the Belgian national lottery.

== Honours ==
=== National honours ===
- 2014: Grand Officer of the Order of Leopold

=== Foreign honours ===
- 2013: Commander in the Legion of Honour
- 2014: Knight Grand Cross of the Order of Merit of the Federal Republic of Germany
- 2016: Knight Grand Cross of the Order of Orange-Nassau
- 2016: Knight Grand Cross in the Order of Merit

== Notes ==
Party political offices
Preceded by Antoine Duquesne	Leader of Reformist Movement (MR); 2004–2011	Succeeded by Charles Michel
Political offices
Preceded by Jean-Jacques Viseur	Minister of Finance; 1999–2011	Succeeded by Steven Vanackere
Preceded by Steven Vanackere	Minister of Foreign Affairs; 2011–2019	Succeeded by Philippe Goffin
Preceded by Sander Loones	Minister of Defence; 2018–2019	Succeeded by Philippe Goffin
Preceded by Marianne Thyssen	Belgian European Commissioner; 2019–2024	Succeeded by Philippe Goffin
Preceded by Věra Jourová	European Commissioner for Justice; 2019–2024	Succeeded by Michael McGrath
