= Sophie Wilmès =

Prime Minister of Belgium from 2019 to 2020

Sophie Wilmès MEP
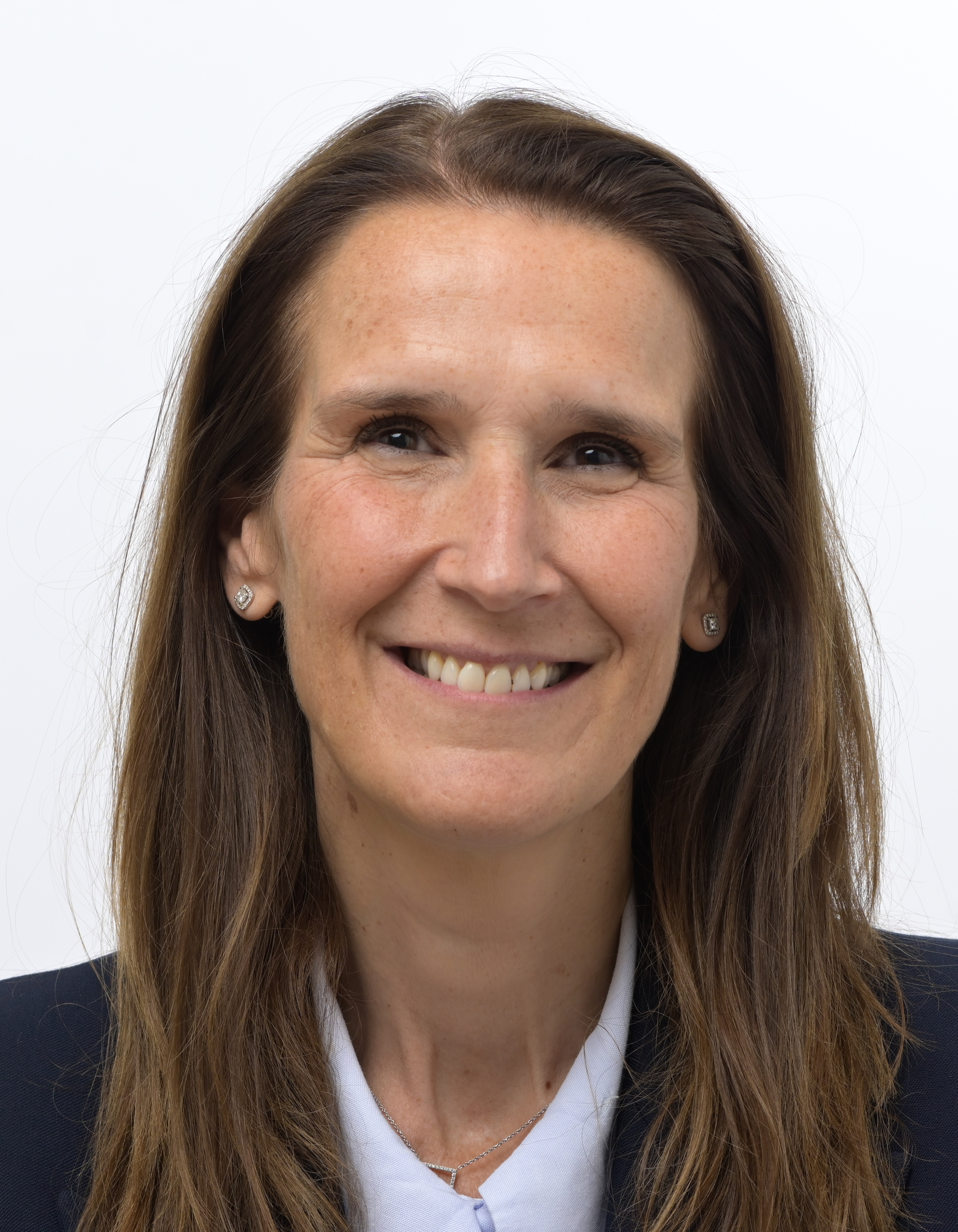
- Official portrait, 2024

Vice-President of the European Parliament
- Incumbent
- Assumed office 16 July 2024
- President: Roberta Metsola

Prime Minister of Belgium
- In office 27 October 2019 – 1 October 2020
- Monarch: Philippe
- Deputy: Koen Geens; Alexander De Croo; Didier Reynders (2019); David Clarinval
- Preceded by: Charles Michel
- Succeeded by: Alexander De Croo

Deputy Prime Minister of Belgium Minister of Foreign Affairs
- In office 1 October 2020 – 15 July 2022
- Prime Minister: Alexander De Croo
- Preceded by: Philippe Goffin (Foreign); David Clarinval (Deputy)
- Succeeded by: Hadja Lahbib (Foreign); David Clarinval (Deputy)

Minister of Budget
- In office 22 September 2015 – 27 October 2019
- Prime Minister: Charles Michel
- Preceded by: Hervé Jamar
- Succeeded by: David Clarinval

Member of the European Parliament for Belgium
- Incumbent
- Assumed office 16 July 2024
- Constituency: French-speaking electoral college

Member of the Chamber of Representatives
- In office 15 July 2022 – 9 June 2024
- In office 25 May 2014 – 22 September 2015

Personal details
- Born: 15 January 1975 (age 51) Ixelles, Belgium
- Party: Reformist Movement
- Spouse: Chris Stone (m. 2002; died 2023)
- Children: 3
- Parent: Philippe Wilmès (father)
- Education: Saint-Louis University, Brussels; Institut des hautes études des communications sociales

Sophie Wilmès (French pronunciation: [sɔfi wilmɛs]; born 15 January 1975) is a Belgian politician who served as the prime minister of Belgium from 2019 to 2020. She later served as minister of foreign affairs from 2020 to 2022. A member of the Reformist Movement, she is the first woman to hold either position. In May 2026, King Philip of Belgium appointed her Minister of State, an honorary title in Belgium granted for exceptional merits.

Wilmès was elected to the Chamber of Representatives in 2014, and served as budget minister in the first and second governments of Charles Michel from 2015 to 2019. In the aftermath of the 2019 Belgian federal election, Philippe of Belgium appointed Wilmès to lead a caretaker government (the Wilmès I Government) before she formed an executive government (the Wilmès II Government) in March 2020 to handle the COVID-19 pandemic.

In October 2020, she joined the government of Prime Minister Alexander De Croo as foreign minister and deputy prime minister. She resigned from the government in 2022 to take care of her husband who suffered from brain cancer. In June 2024, she was elected a member of the European Parliament (MEP), of which she is currently one of the Vice-Presidents.

== Early life ==
Wilmès was born in Ixelles, Brussels on 15 January 1975. Her father, Philippe Wilmès, was a banker and economics professor at the Université catholique de Louvain who had been active in liberal politics and had served as chef de cabinet to Jean Gol of the Liberal Reformist Party (Parti Réformateur Libéral, PRL). Her paternal grandparents were killed in the bombing of Limal during World War II. Her mother is of Jewish descent and lost several relatives in the Holocaust and had worked in the office of Mieke Offeciers between 1992 and 1993, during her term as Minister of Budget. Wilmès grew up in the town of Grez-Doiceau, Walloon Brabant.

Wilmès has a degree in applied communication from IHECS and a degree in financial management (Saint-Louis University, Brussels).

For a time, Wilmès worked for the European Commission as a financial officer, and then as an economic and financial adviser in a law firm.

== Political career ==
In 2000, Wilmès became a councillor in Uccle. From 2006 to 2014, Wilmès was First Alderman in charge of Finance, Budget, Francophone Education, Communication and Local Businesses for the town of Sint-Genesius-Rode. From 2014 to 2015, she was a provincial councillor for the province of Flemish Brabant.

In October 2014, she was elected to the Chamber of Representatives.

In September 2015, minister of the budget Hervé Jamar announced that he would resign on 1 October 2015, because he was selected as the governor of the province of Liège. Wilmès was selected to succeed him in the Michel I Government. In December 2018, she became Minister of Budget, Civil Service, National Lottery and Scientific Policy in the Michel II Government.

On 27 October 2019, Wilmès became the first female Prime Minister of Belgium, succeeding Charles Michel. She led a caretaker government while negotiations proceeded to form a new coalition government. On 16 March 2020, with negotiations still underway after 15 months, all major parties agreed to grant full legislative powers to the Wilmès government in order to fight the COVID-19 pandemic. Under the terms of the agreement, Wilmès was granted special powers to deal with the pandemic's economic and social impact. These powers were to last for three months, though they could be renewed once for an additional three months. Wilmès was officially nominated as prime minister by King Philippe later on 16 March, and her reshuffled executive government was sworn in the day after.

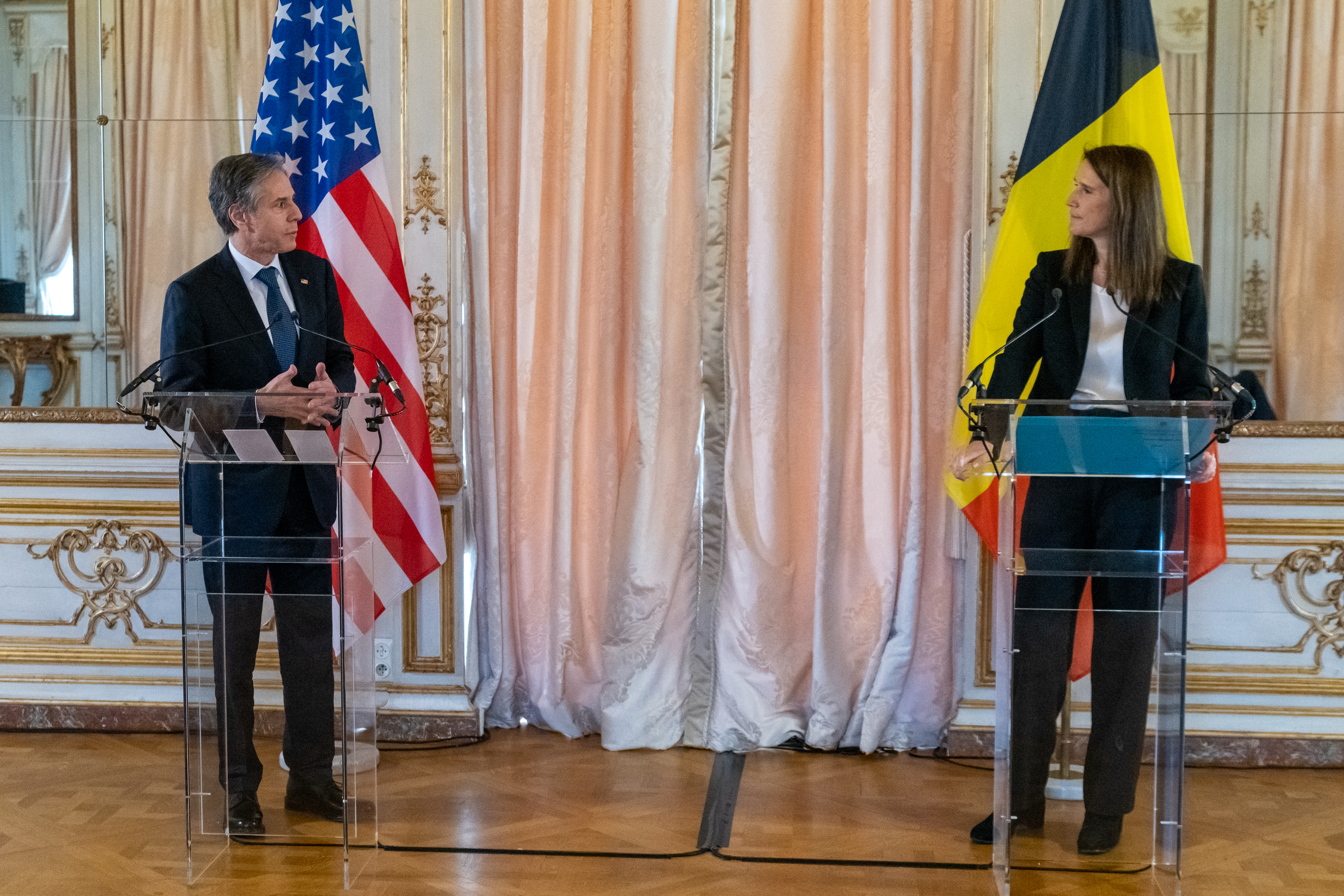
Wilmès (right) with US Secretary of State Antony Blinken in March 2021

On 1 October 2020, Wilmès was appointed deputy prime minister and foreign minister in the new government formed under Alexander De Croo, becoming the first female foreign minister in Belgian history. For a time beginning on 22 October 2020, she managed the country's foreign relations from her intensive care hospital bed as she suffered from COVID-19. It was noted by Deutsche Welle that "Wilmes tested positive for coronavirus" prior to 17 October "after attending an EU summit with her counterparts" at the Europa building in Luxembourg on 12 October, and 13 October. Her Austrian counterpart, Alexander Schallenberg, also subsequently had a positive test.

On 21 April 2022, Wilmès announced that she would temporarily take a leave of absence and hand over her government responsibilities to spend more time with her family as her husband had been diagnosed with an aggressive brain tumour. Wilmès's responsibilities were shared out between the Prime Minister Alexander De Croo (foreign affairs), David Clarinval (foreign trade) and Mathieu Michel (federal cultural entities). On 14 July 2022, Wilmès resigned definitively as a member of the De Croo government, but she remained a member of parliament.

On 24 January 2024, she is appointed leading candidate for the MR in the European elections in place of Charles Michel, who had finally decided to withdraw his candidacy following a wave of criticism. She received more than half a million preferential votes, breaking the record for preferential votes in French-speaking Belgium. MR came out as the big winner in this election, well ahead of the PS, which had been given first place in the polls.

In June 2024, Wilmès was considered for the presidency of Renew Europe but she finally did not submit her candidacy, leaving the job to Valérie Hayer.

On July 16, 2024, she was elected Vice-President of the European Parliament during the first round, with 371 votes.

== Other activities ==
- Council of Women World Leaders, Member

== Personal life ==
In 2002, Wilmès married Chris Stone, an Australian businessman and former footballer. They had three daughters: Victoria, Charlotte, and Elizabeth. Stone had a son, Jonathan, from a previous relationship.

Shortly after the end of her term as prime minister, on 17 October 2020, she tweeted that she was COVID-19-positive. On 22 October, she was admitted to intensive care in stable condition. She was released from hospital on 30 October.

In July 2022, Wilmès announced that she was stepping down from the government to care for her husband, who had been diagnosed with brain cancer. Her husband died from his illness on 24 November 2023.

Political offices
Preceded by Hervé Jamar	Minister of Budget; 2015–2019	Succeeded by David Clarinval
Preceded by Sander Loones	Minister of Public Function; 2018–2019	Succeeded by David Clarinval
Preceded by Charles Michel	Prime Minister of Belgium; 2019–2020	Succeeded by Alexander De Croo
Preceded by Philippe Goffin	Minister of Foreign Affairs; 2020–2022	Succeeded by Hadja Lahbib
