= Minister of Budget (Belgium) =

This is the list of Belgian Budget ministers.

== List of ministers ==
=== Federal ministers ===
==== 2000– ====
| Start | End | Minister | Party affiliation | Extra |
|---|---|---|---|---|
| 1999 | 2004 | Johan Vande Lanotte | Socialistische Partij Anders | |
| 2004 | 2007 | Freya Van den Bossche | Socialistische Partij Anders | |
| 2007 | 2008 | Yves Leterme | Christian Democratic and Flemish | |
| 2008 | 2011 | Melchior Wathelet, Jr. | Humanist Democratic Centre | State Secretary |
| 2009 | 2011 | Guy Vanhengel | Open Vld | |
| 2011 | 2014 | Olivier Chastel | Mouvement Réformateur | |
| 2014 | 2015 | Hervé Jamar | Mouvement Réformateur | |
| 2015 | 2019 | Sophie Wilmès | Mouvement Réformateur | |
| 2019 | 2020 | David Clarinval | Mouvement Réformateur | |
| 2020 | 2022 | Eva De Bleeker | Open Vld | State Secretary |
| 2022 | current | Alexia Bertrand | Open Vld | State Secretary |

=== Flemish ministers ===
==== 2000– ====
| Start | End | Minister | Party affiliation | Extra |
|---|---|---|---|---|
| 1999 | 2001 | Patrick Dewael | Flemish Liberals and Democrats | |
| 2001 | 2009 | Dirk Van Mechelen | Flemish Liberals and Democrats; Open Flemish Liberals and Democrats | |
| 2009 | 2014 | Philippe Muyters | New Flemish Alliance | |
| 2014 | 2016 | Annemie Turtelboom | Open Flemish Liberals and Democrats | |
| 2016 | 2018 | Bart Tommelein | Open Flemish Liberals and Democrats | |
| 2018 | 2019 | Lydia Peeters | Open Flemish Liberals and Democrats | |
| 2019 | current | Matthias Diependaele | New Flemish Alliance | |
