= List of foreign ministers of Belgium =

The following is a list of those who have served as foreign ministers of Belgium.

== 1800s ==
Name	Date of birth	Date of death	Office Entered	Office Left	Party
Sylvain Van de Weyer	19 January 1802	23 May 1874	1831	1831	LP
Joseph Lebeau	3 January 1794	19 March 1865	1831	1831	LP
Felix de Muelenaere	5 April 1793	5 August 1862	1831	1831	PC
Albert Joseph Goblet d'Alviella	26 May 1790	5 May 1873	1831	1834	LP
Felix de Muelenaere	5 April 1793	5 August 1862	1834	1836	PC
Barthélémy de Theux de Meylandt	26 February 1794	21 August 1874	1836	1840	PC
Joseph Lebeau	3 January 1794	19 March 1865	1840	1841	LP
Camille de Briey	27 June 1799	3 June 1877	1841	1843	PC
Felix de Muelenaere	5 April 1793	5 August 1862	1843	1845	PC
Adolphe Dechamps	18 June 1807	19 July 1875	1845	1847	PC
Constant d'Hoffschmidt	7 March 1804	14 February 1873	1847	1852	LP
Henri de Brouckère	25 January 1801	25 January 1891	1852	1855	LP
Charles Vilain XIIII	15 May 1803	16 November 1878	1855	1857	PC
Adolphe de Vrière	9 April 1806	16 July 1885	1857	1861	LP
Charles Rogier	17 August 1800	27 May 1885	1861	1867	LP
Jules Vander Stichelen	18 September 1822	19 July 1880	1868	1870	LP
Jules d'Anethan	23 April 1803	8 October 1888	1870	1871	PC
Guillaume d'Aspremont Lynden	14 October 1815	6 September 1889	1871	1878	PC
Walthère Frère-Orban	24 April 1812	1 January 1896	1878	1884	LP
Alphonse de Moreau	8 March 1840	2 August 1911	1884	1884	PC
Joseph de Riquet de Caraman-Chimay	9 October 1836	29 March 1892	1884	1892	PC
Henri de Mérode-Westerloo	28 December 1858	13 July 1908	1892	1895	PC
Jules de Burlet	10 April 1844	1 March 1897	1895	1896	PC
Paul de Favereau	15 January 1856	26 September 1922	1896	1907	PC

== 1900s ==
Name	Date of birth	Date of death	Office Entered	Office Left	Party
Julien Davignon	3 December 1854	12 March 1916	1907	1916	PSC-CVP
Eugène Beyens	24 March 1855	3 January 1934	1916	1917	PSC-CVP
Charles de Broqueville	4 December 1860	5 September 1940	1917	1918	PSC-CVP
Paul Hymans	23 March 1865	8 March 1941	1918	1920	LP
Henri Jaspar	28 July 1870	15 February 1939	1920	1924	PSC-CVP
Paul Hymans	23 March 1865	8 March 1941	1924	1925	LP
Emile Vandervelde	25 January 1866	27 December 1938	1925	1927	BWP
Paul Hymans	23 March 1865	8 March 1941	1927	1934	LP
Henri Jaspar	28 July 1870	15 February 1939	1934	1934	PSC-CVP
Paul Hymans	23 March 1865	8 March 1941	1934	1935	LP
Paul Van Zeeland	11 November 1893	22 September 1973	1935	1936	PSC-CVP
Paul-Henri Spaak	25 January 1899	31 July 1972	1939	1949	PSB-BSP
Paul Van Zeeland	11 November 1893	22 September 1973	1949	1954	PSC-CVP
Paul-Henri Spaak	25 January 1899	31 July 1972	1954	1957	PSB-BSP
Victor Larock	6 October 1904	24 April 1977	1957	1958	PSB-BSP
Pierre Wigny	18 April 1905	21 September 1986	1958	1961	PSC-CVP
Paul-Henri Spaak	25 January 1899	31 July 1972	1961	1966	PSB-BSP
Pierre Harmel	16 March 1911	15 November 2009	1966	1973	PSC-CVP
Renaat Van Elslande	21 January 1916	21 December 2000	1973	1977	CVP
Henri Simonet	10 May 1931	15 February 1996	1977	1980	PS
Charles-Ferdinand Nothomb	3 May 1936	19 April 2023	1980	1981	PSC
Leo Tindemans	16 April 1922	26 December 2014	1981	1989	CVP
Mark Eyskens	29 April 1933		1989	1992	CVP
Willy Claes	24 November 1938		1992	1994	SP
Frank Vandenbroucke	21 October 1955		10 October 1994	22 March 1995	SP
Erik Derycke	28 October 1949		22 March 1995	12 July 1999	SP
Louis Michel	2 September 1947		12 July 1999	18 July 2004	PRL, MR

== 2000s ==
Name	Date of birth	Date of death	Office Entered	Office Left	Party
Karel De Gucht	27 January 1954		18 July 2004	17 July 2009	VLD
Yves Leterme	6 October 1960		17 July 2009	25 November 2009	CD&V
Steven Vanackere	4 February 1964		25 November 2009	6 December 2011	CD&V
Didier Reynders	6 August 1958		6 December 2011	30 November 2019	MR
Philippe Goffin	1 April 1967		30 November 2019	1 October 2020	MR
Sophie Wilmès	15 January 1975		1 October 2020	14 July 2022	MR
Hadja Lahbib	21 June 1970		15 July 2022	30 November 2024	MR
Bernard Quintin	1971		30 November 2024	3 February 2025	MR
Maxime Prévot	9 April 1978		3 February 2025	Current	LE
