= Koen Geens =

Belgian politician (born 1958)

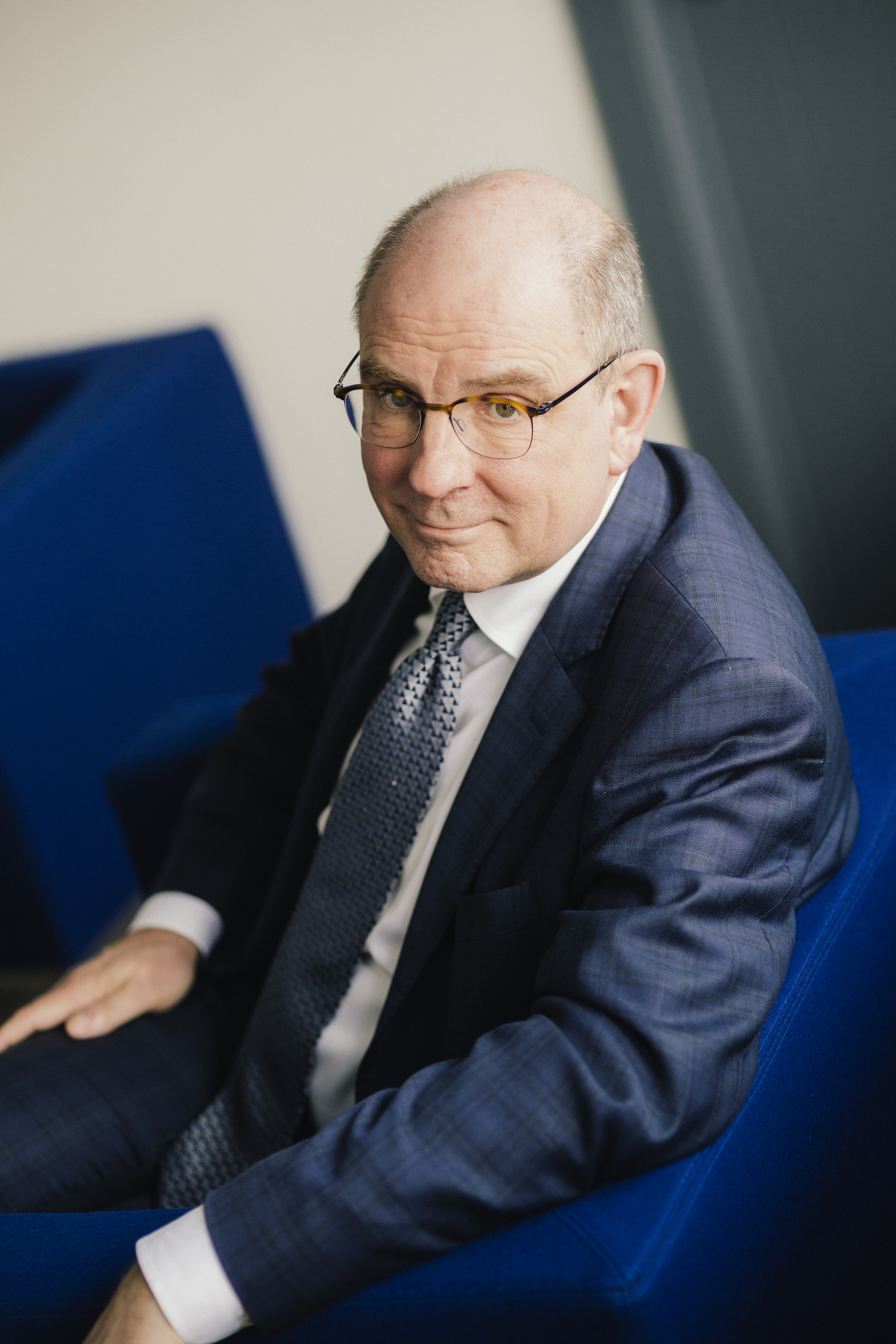

Deputy Prime Minister of Belgium
- In office 2 July 2019 – 1 October 2020
- Prime Minister: Charles Michel; Sophie Wilmès
- Preceded by: Kris Peeters

Minister of Justice
- In office 11 October 2014 – 1 October 2020
- Prime Minister: Charles Michel; Sophie Wilmès
- Preceded by: Annemie Turtelboom
- Succeeded by: Vincent Van Quickenborne

Minister of Finance
- In office 5 March 2013 – 11 October 2014
- Prime Minister: Elio Di Rupo
- Preceded by: Steven Vanackere
- Succeeded by: Johan Van Overtveldt

Personal details
- Born: 22 January 1958 (age 68) Merksem, Belgium
- Party: Christian Democratic and Flemish
- Education: University of Antwerp; Catholic University of Leuven; Harvard University

Koenraad Frans Julia Geens (born 22 January 1958) is a Belgian jurist and politician of the Christian Democratic and Flemish (CD&V) who served as the Minister of Justice and as Deputy Prime Minister in the governments of Prime Ministers Charles Michel and Sophie Wilmès.

== Early life and education ==
Geens studied at the University of Antwerp (UFSIA) and the Catholic University of Leuven (KU Leuven), where he received his law degree in 1980, and at Harvard University where he received an LL.M.

== Career ==
=== Early career ===
Since 1986 Geens has become a professor at the KU Leuven. In that capacity, he was appointed by the Belgian government as the scientific coordinator for the codification of the Belgian laws on companies and financial accounts, which culminated in a new Belgian company code in 2001. In 2009 Geens was a candidate for rector of the KU Leuven but lost out to Mark Waer.

Geens is a co-founder of an independent lawfirm in Belgium with offices in Antwerp, Brussels and Kortrijk.

=== Political career ===
From 2007 to 2009 Geens served as chief of staff to the Flemish minister-president Kris Peeters. When Steven Vanackere resigned in March 2013 as Minister of Finance, Geens was appointed as his successor.

In October 2014 Geens became Minister of Justice in the Michel Government. In addition, he chaired the European People's Party’s Justice Ministers Meeting.

During his time in office, Geens steered through the legislative process a 2015 law which invalidated passports and identity cards of people authorities believe plan to go and fight for militant Islamist organizations in the Middle East. In the wake of the 2016 Brussels bombings, both Geens and fellow cabinet member Jan Jambon offered their resignation to Prime Minister Michel over lapses; both were refused.

As part of the government formation, Geens was appointed by King Philippe of Belgium to explore possibilities to form a coalition government in early 2020.

== Other activities ==
=== International organizations ===
- African Development Bank (AfDB), Ex-Officio Alternate Member of the Board of Governors (2013-2014)
- Asian Development Bank (ADB), Ex-Officio Member of the Board of Governors (2013-2014)
- European Bank for Reconstruction and Development (EBRD), Ex-Officio Member of the Board of Governors (2013-2014)
- European Investment Bank (EIB), Ex-Officio Member of the Board of Governors (2013-2014)
- Inter-American Investment Corporation (IIC), Ex-Officio Member of the Board of Governors (2013-2014)
- International Monetary Fund (IMF), Ex-Officio Alternate Member of the Board of Governors (2013-2014)
- Multilateral Investment Guarantee Agency (MIGA), World Bank Group, Ex-Officio Member of the Board of Governors (2013-2014)
- World Bank, Ex-Officio Member of the Board of Governors (2013-2014)

=== Corporate boards ===
- BNP Paribas Fortis, Non-Executive Member of the Board of Directors (2011-2013)

=== Non-profit organizations ===
- Academia Europaea, Member (since 2012)
- Academy of European Law (ERA), Member of the Governing Board
- KU Leuven, Member of the Board of Trustees
- Royal Flemish Academy of Belgium for Science and the Arts, Member

Political offices
Preceded by Steven Vanackere	Minister of Finance; 2013–2014	Succeeded by Johan Van Overtveldt
Preceded by Maggie De Block	Minister of Justice; 2014–2020	Succeeded by Vincent Van Quickenborne
