= Minister of Mobility (Belgium) =

The Minister of Mobility is a political office comparable to the Ministry of Transport in other countries. It is mainly organized at the regional level.

== List of ministers ==
=== Flanders ===
Name	Office Entered	Office Left	Party
Johan Sauwens	1988	1992	VU
Theo Kelchtermans	1992	1992	CVP
Johan Sauwens	1992	1995	VU
Eddy Baldewijns	1995	1999	SP.A
Steve Stevaert	1999	2003	SP.A
Gilbert Bossuyt	2003	2004	SP.A
Kathleen Van Brempt	2004	2009	SP.A
Hilde Crevits	2009	2014	CD&V
Ben Weyts	2014	2019	N-VA
Lydia Peeters	2019	present	VLD

=== Wallonia ===
Name	Office Entered	Office Left	Party
André Baudson	1992	1995	PS
Michel Lebrun	1995	1999	PSC
José Daras	1999	2004	Ecolo
André Antoine	2004	2009	CDH
Philippe Henry	2009	2014	Ecolo
Carlo Di Antonio	2014	2019	CDH
Philippe Henry	2019	2024	Ecolo
François Desquesnes	2024	present	LE
