= Walloon name =

Since Belgium has three national languages — Dutch, French and German — Belgian names are similar to those in the neighbouring countries: the Netherlands, France and Germany. Place names (regions, towns, villages, hamlets) with a particle meaning "from" (de in French, del in Walloon, or van in Dutch) are the most numerous. An uncapitalised particle sometimes indicates nobility.

Here is for example the chronological list of minister-presidents of Wallonia :

Name	Origin
Jean-Maurice Dehousse	French / Walloon origin (literally from Housse)
André Damseaux	French / Walloon origin (derived from Damoiseau)
Melchior Wathelet	French / Walloon origin (probably a diminutive from Gautier / Walter)
Guy Coëme	French / Walloon origin (derived from the surname Cosme)
Bernard Anselme	French / Walloon origin (derived from the surname Anselme)
Robert Collignon	French / Walloon origin (diminutive from Collin)
Elio Di Rupo	Italian origin
Jean-Claude Van Cauwenberghe	Flemish origin (literally from the cold hill)
André Antoine	French / Walloon origin (derived from the surname Antoine)
Rudy Demotte	Flemish / French origin (The Motte in Dutch, From the Motte in French)

For French family names among the Walloons and other francophones of Belgium, see French name.

The twenty most common French surnames in Belgium are respectively Dubois, Lambert, Dupont, Martin, Dumont, Leroy, Leclercq, Simon, Laurent, François, Denis, Renard, Thomas, Lejeune, Gérard, Petit, Mathieu, Lemaire, Charlier, and Bertrand. Sources

Some surnames have an unclear origin, like Berger, meaning shepherd in French, and mountaineer in Dutch and German. The particle De also means From or From the in French and means The in Dutch, which does not help finding the origin.

Flemish surnames are also common, due to Flemish economic immigration from 1850 to 1950. See Flanders name.

There are also a lot of typical Walloon surnames, like Monami (fr: Mon ami, en: My friend), Dehasse (fr: de Hasselt, en: from Hasselt), Delcroix (fr: de la Croix, en: from the Cross), Delhaize or Donnay (some famous tennis equipment in the 1980s).

Even crossed etymologies can be found like Deflandre (meaning in French from Flanders) or Dehasse (fr: de Hasselt, en: from Hasselt, in Flemish Region).
