= Government of Wallonia =

Executive branch of Wallonia

- Gouvernement de Wallonie
- Coat of arms of Wallonia

Overview
- Established: 1979; 47 years ago
- Polity: Wallonia (Belgium)
- Leader: Minister-President
- Responsible to: Parliament of Wallonia
- Headquarters: Élysette in Namur
- Website: gouvernement.wallonie.be

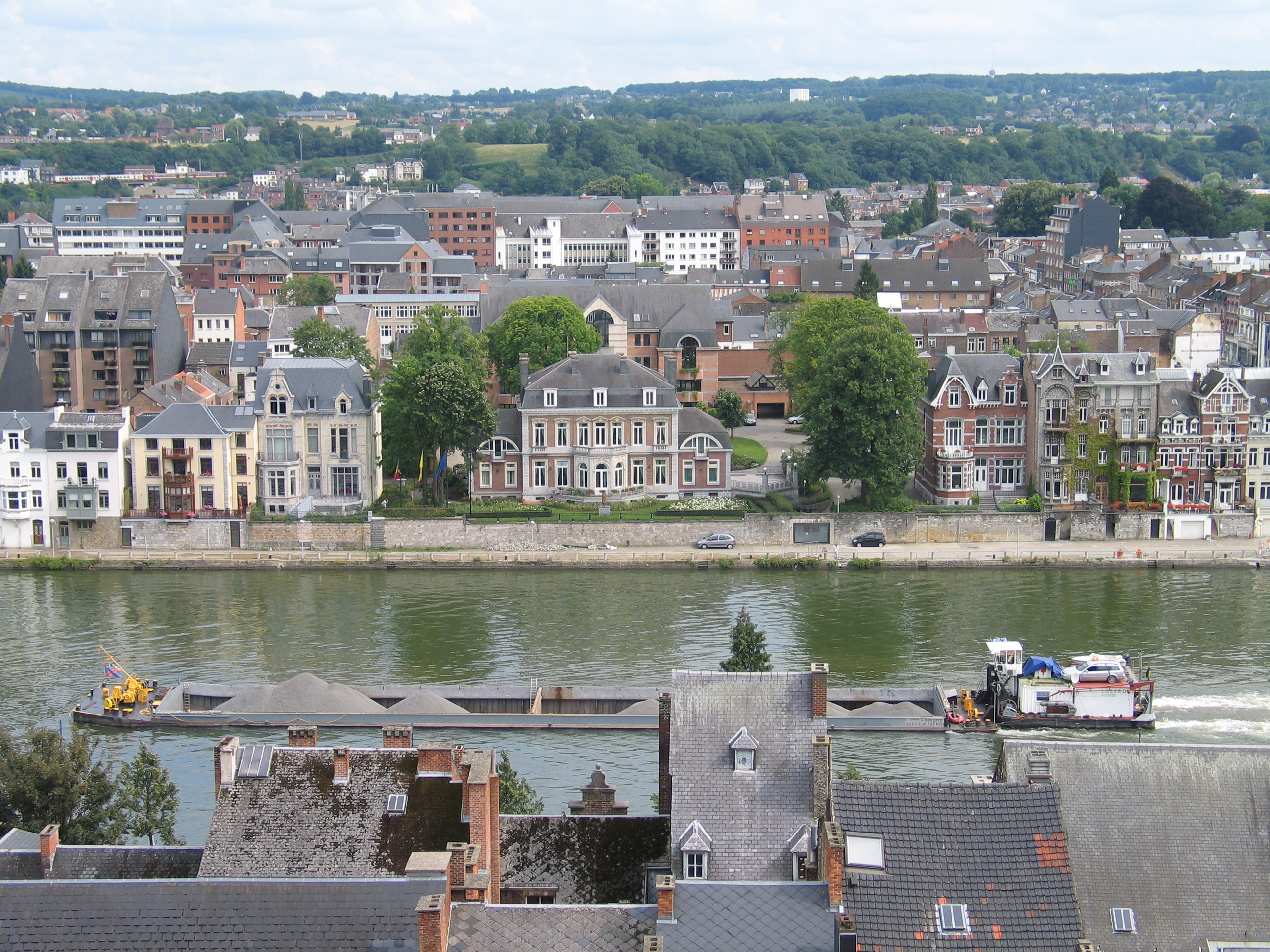
The Élysette in Namur is the office building of the Walloon Minister-President

The Government of Wallonia (French: Gouvernement de Wallonie, pronounced [ɡuvɛʁnəmɑ̃ də walɔni]) or Walloon Government (French: Gouvernement wallon, pronounced [ɡuvɛʁnəmɑ̃ walɔ̃]) is the executive branch of Wallonia and one of the six governments in Belgium. It is located in Namur, where the Parliament of Wallonia is also seated.

== Compositions ==
=== Current composition (Dolimont) ===
Following the 2024 Belgian regional elections, the Mouvement Réformateur (MR) (26 seats) became the largest party and chose to form a government together with the third party Les Engagés (LE) (17 seats). The 43 seats they have together is sufficient for a majority (38 needed). The parties agreed on 13 July 2024 to form a government and the new ministers were sworn in on 15 July 2024.

Walloon Government - Dolimont
Function	Name	Party
Minister-president; Minister of Budget, Finance, Animal Welfare, International Affairs, and Firearms Licenses	Adrien Dolimont	MR
Vice-President; Minister of Urban Planning, Public Works, Traffic Safety; and Local Affairs	François Desquesnes	LE
Vice-President; Minister of Economy and Employment	Pierre-Yves Jeholet	MR
Minister of Agriculture and Rural Affairs	Anne-Catherine Dalcq	MR
Minister of Energy, Air-Climate Plan, Housing and Airports	Cécile Neven	MR
Minister of Sports, Infrastructure, and Media	Jacqueline Galant	MR
Minister of Tourism, Heritage, Infrastructure, and Childcare	Valérie Lescrenier	LE
Minister of Health, Environment, Social Economy, Social Action, Fight against Poverty, Handicapped, and Families	Yves Coppieters	LE

=== Composition 2019–2024 (Di Rupo III) ===
On 13 September 2019 it was announced that Elio Di Rupo would become the minister-President of Wallonia again for the third time, in a government led by the Socialist Party (PS) (23 seats), together with MR (20 seats) and Ecolo (12 seats).

Walloon Government - Di Rupo III
Function	Name	Party
Minister-president	Elio di Rupo	PS
Vice-President; Minister of Employment, Social Affairs, Health and Equality	Christie Morreale	PS
Vice-President; Minister of Economy, Foreign Trade, Spatial Planning and Agriculture	Willy Borsus	MR
Minister of Local Government and Housing	Pierre-Yves Dermagne (until 1 October 2020)	PS
Minister of Local Government and Housing	Christophe Collignon (from 1 October 2020)	PS
Minister of Budget, Sports Infrastructure and Airports	Jean-Luc Crucke (until 13 January 2022)	MR
Minister of Budget, Sports Infrastructure and Airports	Adrien Dolimont (from 13 January 2022)	MR
Minister of Civil Service Matters, Administrative Simplification, Child Benefits, Tourism, Heritage and Traffic Safety	Valérie De Bue	MR
Minister of Environment, Nature, Rural Renovation and Animal Welfare	Céline Tellier	Ecolo
Minister of Climate, Mobility, Infrastructure and Energy	Philippe Henry	Ecolo

=== Composition 2017–2019 (Borsus) ===
On 19 June 2017, the CDH announced it was no longer willing to govern together with the PS following several scandals in Belgian politics in which high placed members of the PS were involved typically receiving high payments for extra functions, including in Publifin and SAMU Social. On 25 July the CDH (13 seats) formed a new coalition together with the MR (25 seats), only narrowly getting a majority (38 out of 75 seats), to create the first government since 1988 in which the PS was not involved. The number of ministers was reduced from eight to seven.

Walloon Government - Borsus
Function	Name	Party
Minister-President	Willy Borsus	MR
Vice-President; Minister of Economy and Employment	Pierre-Yves Jeholet	MR
Vice-President; Minister of Social Affairs, Health and Equality	Alda Greoli	MR
Minister of Agriculture, Nature, Forests and Tourism	René Collin	cdH
Minister of Budget, Energy and Airports	Adrien Dolimont	cdH
Minister of Local Government, Housing and Sports Infrastructure	Valérie De Bue	MR
Minister of Environment, Mobility, Spatial Planning, Public Works and Animal Well-Being	Carlo Di Antonio	cdH

=== Composition 2014–2017 (Magnette) ===
Following the 25 May 2014 election, PS (30 seats) and CDH (13 seats) parties formed a coalition.

Walloon Government - Magnette
Function	Name	Party
Minister-President	Paul Magnette	PS
Vice-President; Minister of Economy, Industry, Innovation and Digitalisation	Jean-Claude Marcourt	PS
Vice-President; Minister of Public Works, Health, Social Action and Heritage	Maxime Prévot	cdH
Minister of Local Government, City Policy, Housing and Energy	Paul Furlan (until 26 January 2017)	PS
Minister of Local Government, City Policy and Housing	Pierre-Yves Dermagne (from 26 January 2016)	PS
Minister of Environment, Spatial Planning, Mobility, Transport, Airports and Animal Welfare	Carlo Di Antonio	cdH
Minister of Employment and Formation	Eliane Tillieux	PS
Minister of Budget, Public Office, Administrative Simplification and Energy	Christophe Lacroix	PS
Minister of Agriculture, Nature, Rusticity, Tourism and Sports Infrastructure	René Collin	cdH

=== Composition 2009–2014 ===
Following the 7 June 2009 election, PS (29 seats), Ecolo (14 seats) and CDH (13 seats) parties formed a coalition.

Walloon Government - Demotte II
Party	Name	Function
PS	Rudy Demotte	Minister-President
PS	Jean-Claude Marcourt	Vice-President; Minister of Economy and Foreign Commerce
PS	Paul Furlan	Minister of Local Government and City Policy
PS	Eliane Tillieux	Minister of Social Action and Public Health
CDH	Benoît Lutgen	Minister of Public Works, Agriculture, Rural Affairs, Patrimony and Nature Policy
CDH	André Antoine	Minister of Budget, Finance, Employment, Education and Sports
Ecolo	Jean-Marc Nollet	Minister of Energy, Housing, Public Office and Sustainable Development
Ecolo	Philippe Henry	Minister of Mobility and Planning

=== Composition 2004–2009 ===
After the elections of 13 June 2004, the PS (34 seats) en CDH (14 seats) formed a coalition.

Walloon Cabinet - Demotte I
Party	Name	Function
PS	Rudy Demotte (from July 2007)	Minister-President
PS	Elio Di Rupo (from October 2005 until July 2007)	Minister-President
PS	Jean-Claude Van Cauwenberghe (until 30 September 2005)	Minister-President
CDH	André Antoine (politician)	Vice-President; Minister of Housing, Transport and Territorial Development
PS	Michel Daerden	Vice-President; Minister of Budget, Finance and Public Works
PS	Marie Arena	Minister of Formation/Training
PS	Philippe Courard	Minister of Home Affairs and Public Function
CDH	Marie-Dominique Simonet	Minister of Scientific Research, New Technologies en Foreign Affairs
PS	Jean-Claude Marcourt	Minister of Economy, Employment, Foreign Commerce and Patrimony
PS	Christiane Vienne	Minister of Public Health, Social Affairs and Equal Chances
CDH	Benoît Lutgen	Minister of Agriculture, Rural Affairs, Environment and Tourism
