= Elio Di Rupo =

Prime Minister of Belgium from 2011 to 2014

Elio Di Rupo MEP
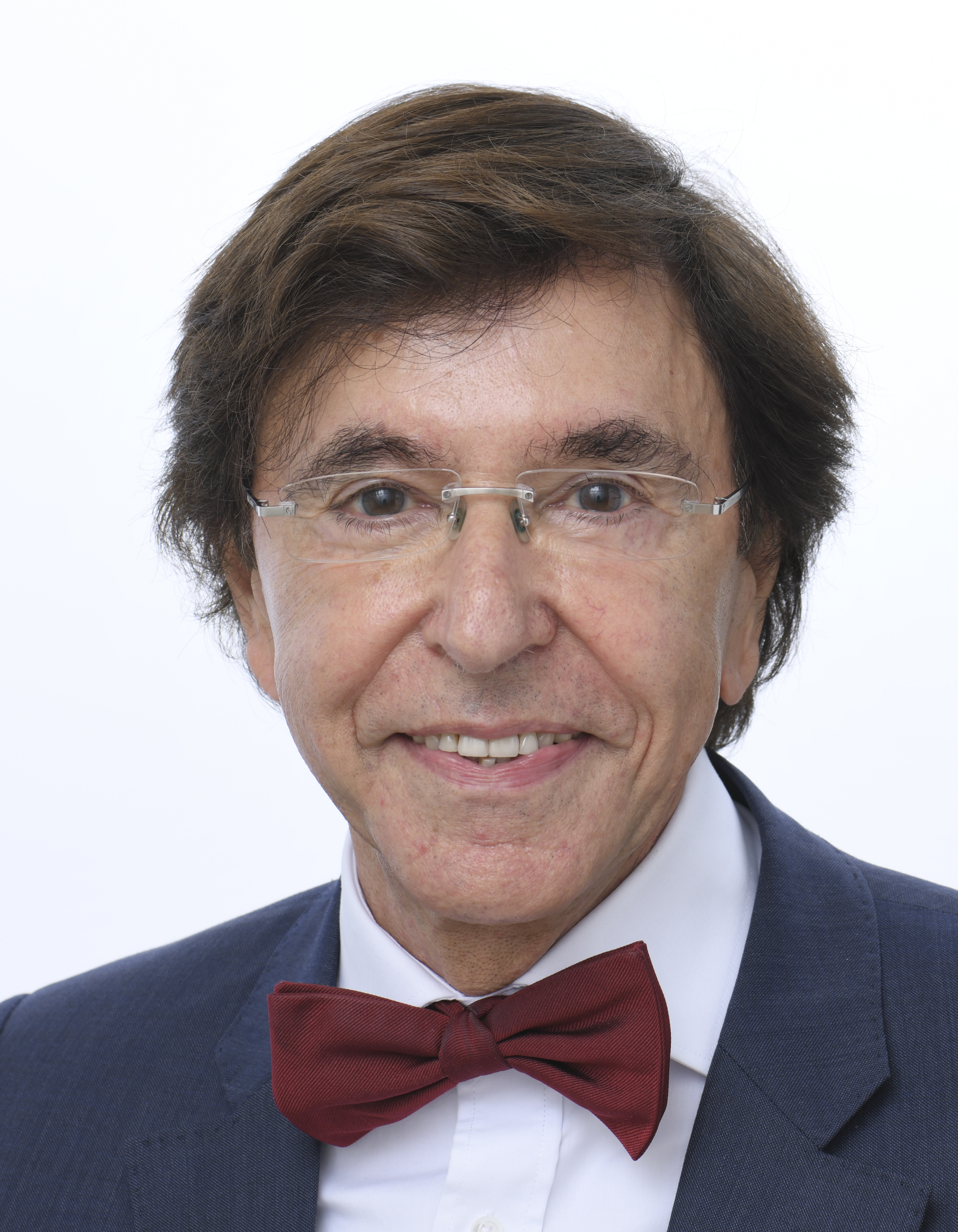
- Official portrait, 2024

Prime Minister of Belgium
- In office 6 December 2011 – 11 October 2014
- Monarchs: Albert II; Philippe
- Preceded by: Yves Leterme
- Succeeded by: Charles Michel

Minister-President of Wallonia
- In office 13 September 2019 – 15 July 2024
- Preceded by: Willy Borsus
- Succeeded by: Adrien Dolimont
- In office 6 October 2005 – 20 July 2007
- Preceded by: André Antoine
- Succeeded by: Rudy Demotte
- In office 15 July 1999 – 4 April 2000
- Preceded by: Robert Collignon
- Succeeded by: Jean-Claude Van Cauwenberghe

Leader of the Socialist Party
- In office 22 November 2014 – 21 October 2019
- Preceded by: Paul Magnette
- Succeeded by: Paul Magnette
- In office 16 September 1999 – 6 December 2011
- Preceded by: Philippe Busquin
- Succeeded by: Thierry Giet

Mayor of Mons
- In office 1 January 2001 – 3 December 2018
- Preceded by: Maurice Lafosse
- Succeeded by: Nicolas Martin

Member of the European Parliament for Belgium
- Incumbent
- Assumed office 16 July 2024
- Constituency: French-speaking electoral college
- In office 25 July 1989 – 16 December 1991

Member of the Chamber of Representatives
- In office 18 December 1987 – 12 July 2019

Personal details
- Born: 18 July 1951 (age 75) Morlanwelz, Belgium
- Party: Socialist Party
- Education: University of Mons-Hainaut; University of Leeds

Elio Di Rupo (French: [eljo di ʁupo]; born 18 July 1951) is a Belgian politician who served as the prime minister of Belgium from 2011 to 2014, heading the Di Rupo Government, and as minister-president of Wallonia for three non-consecutive terms between 1999 and 2024. He was the first francophone to hold the prime ministership since Paul Vanden Boeynants in 1979, and the country's first socialist prime minister since Edmond Leburton left office in 1974. Di Rupo was also Belgium's first prime minister of non-Belgian descent, and the world's second openly LGBT person and first openly bisexual man to be head of government in modern times.

== Background and early life ==
Di Rupo was born in Morlanwelz, Wallonia, to Italian parents. His father was born in San Valentino in Abruzzo Citeriore. While Di Rupo was born in Belgium, his brothers and sisters were all born in Italy. When he was one year old, his father died in a car crash and his mother was unable to raise all seven children. Due to the poor financial state of his family, three of his brothers were raised in a nearby orphanage.

When he was 12, he attended boarding school. Due to medical issues, Di Rupo had to re-do his first year of high school twice, but eventually excelled in science at the end of his high school years. This led him to pursue a degree in chemistry at the University of Mons, where he eventually obtained a PhD in Chemistry, after being a part-time lecturer at Leeds University as well.

== Political career ==
Di Rupo came in contact with the socialist movement for the first time during his studies in Mons, where he first obtained a master's degree and afterwards a PhD in chemistry. He went during the preparation of his doctorate to the University of Leeds (United Kingdom), where his function was that of lecture member of staff in 1977–1978.

He started his political career as an attaché at the cabinet of Jean-Maurice Dehousse in 1980–81. His first political mandate came in 1982, when he was Councillor of Mons (until 1985, and again from 1988 until 2000). In 1986, he was mayor of health, urban renewal and social affairs. Professionally, Di Rupo was at the same time cabinet member and then Deputy Head of Cabinet of the minister of finance of that time of the Walloon region and consequently Deputy Head of Cabinet of the minister of finance and energy of the Walloon region at that time Philippe Busquin (1981–85) and superintendent of the energy-inspection of the ministry of the Walloon region.

He is a deputy (MP) for the Arrondissement of Mons in the Belgian Chamber of Representatives. He once described François Mitterrand as being "a character from a novel".

In 2001, he became the mayor of Mons, which is the capital of the province of Hainaut.

In 1987, he got his national political breakthrough. He was elected as member of the Chamber of Deputies and went two years later for a short time to the European Parliament.

In 1991, Di Rupo was chosen as a senator, but shortly afterwards (1992), he took in the French-speaking community his first ministerial function in Education and later also Media. These were his responsibilities until Guy Coëme, who was mentioned in the Agusta-scandal, resigned and Di Rupo went to the federal government in 1994 as Deputy Prime Minister and Minister of Traffic and Governmental companies. Following the elections in 1995, he remained the Vice-Prime Minister of Belgium and was appointed minister of Economics and Telecommunications. In 1995 he signed the merger of the Belgian airline Sabena with Swiss Air that eventually led to the bankruptcy of Sabena with thousands of unemployed employees as result.

In 1996, at the time of the Dutroux affair, Olivier Trusgnach, a prostitute, alleged that Di Rupo paid him for sex while Trusgnach was still a minor. This accusation could have meant the end of his political career. Di Rupo denied the accusations.

After the federal and regional elections of June 1999 in which, due to the Dioxin Affair, the Christian-Democrats lost many of their votes, Di Rupo negotiated with the Flemish socialists of sp.a, the Liberals and Green Party to form a "purple-green" government. Di Rupo himself was in charge of the function of minister-president of the Walloon region, but already in October of the same year the members of the party chose him as president and in April 2000, he was succeeded in his function of minister-president by Jean-Claude Van Cauwenberghe.

As new president of the party, Di Rupo was forced to make a generation change within the PS and go down a new path. During the regional and federal elections of 1995 and 1999, the PS lost many of its votes, partly because of corruption scandals in the 1990s (named Agusta-scandal and UNIOP-affair), in which the most prominent PS-politicians were involved. PS had been in the government subsequently since 1988 (in the regional government and in the federal government), but the liberal PRL (now MR) became in the 1999-elections as strong as the PS. Apart from those two, Ecolo also became an important political party. Di Rupo realised that drastic action was required to regain the position of the PS. By several measures, such as "Contrat d'avenir pour la Wallonie" (Contract for the Future of Wallonia) and a new generation of party leaders, by which Marie Arena was important, he tried to reassemble the left wing-forces around him. Successfully, because in the elections of 2003, PS regained the electoral score of 1991 and was by far the most important political party before MR. During the regional elections of 2004, it also became the most important party in the Brussels capital region.

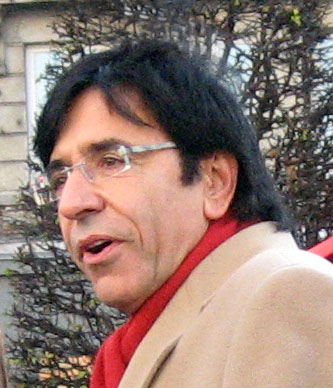
Di Rupo in 2007

Di Rupo changed, in 2004, the liberal coalition partner for the Christian-democratic party, in the Walloon Government and in the Brussels Capital Government (in the last also the green party Ecolo was part of the government). By doing this, coalitions were made which differed from the federal coalition at that time. In October 2005, he became Minister-President of Wallonia after Jean-Claude Van Cauwenberghe resigned amid a corruption scandal, involving several members of Di Rupo's party. He continued as party leader though and has had to deal with the PS's ICDI affair that emerged in May 2006.

In 2006 and 2007, Di Rupo and his party appeared unsuccessful in trying to clean out corruption. This was probably instrumental in the party's losing its first place amongst French community parties 2007 federal election. Di Rupo then decided to take a firmer stance against corruption in Charleroi: he virtually took control of the city's Socialist Party and ordered the Socialist mayor and aldermen to resign.

After former PS president Guy Spitaels urged him to choose between the presidency of the party and of the Walloon Government, Di Rupo decided to organise internal elections for party president in July 2007 rather than in October of that year and announced that he would resign from his mandate as Minister-President if re-elected. On 11 July 2007, he was re-elected president of the Socialist Party with 89.5% of the votes.

=== Prime Minister of Belgium ===
Following the 2010 Belgian general election, in which the PS emerged as the largest of the Francophone parties and the second largest political party in Belgium, speculation emerged as to whether Di Rupo could be the Prime Minister in a new government. The RTBF raised questions, however, about whether Di Rupo's limited fluency in Dutch would be a stumbling block in seeking that office; every prime minister since 1979 had been a Fleming.

In May 2011, he was appointed Formateur by King Albert II, which gave Di Rupo the task of forming a government. Traditionally, the Formateur also becomes the prime minister of the government he forms. He became prime minister of the Di Rupo I Government on 6 December 2011.

With Di Rupo's appointment, Belgium ended 589 days without a government, believed to be the longest such streak ever for a country in the developed world. Yves Leterme had resigned on 26 April 2010 and had been serving as caretaker prime minister since then.

== Board of directors ==
Between 2004 and 2005, Elio Di Rupo was on the board of directors of what was then Dexia bank, currently Belfius.

== Personal life ==
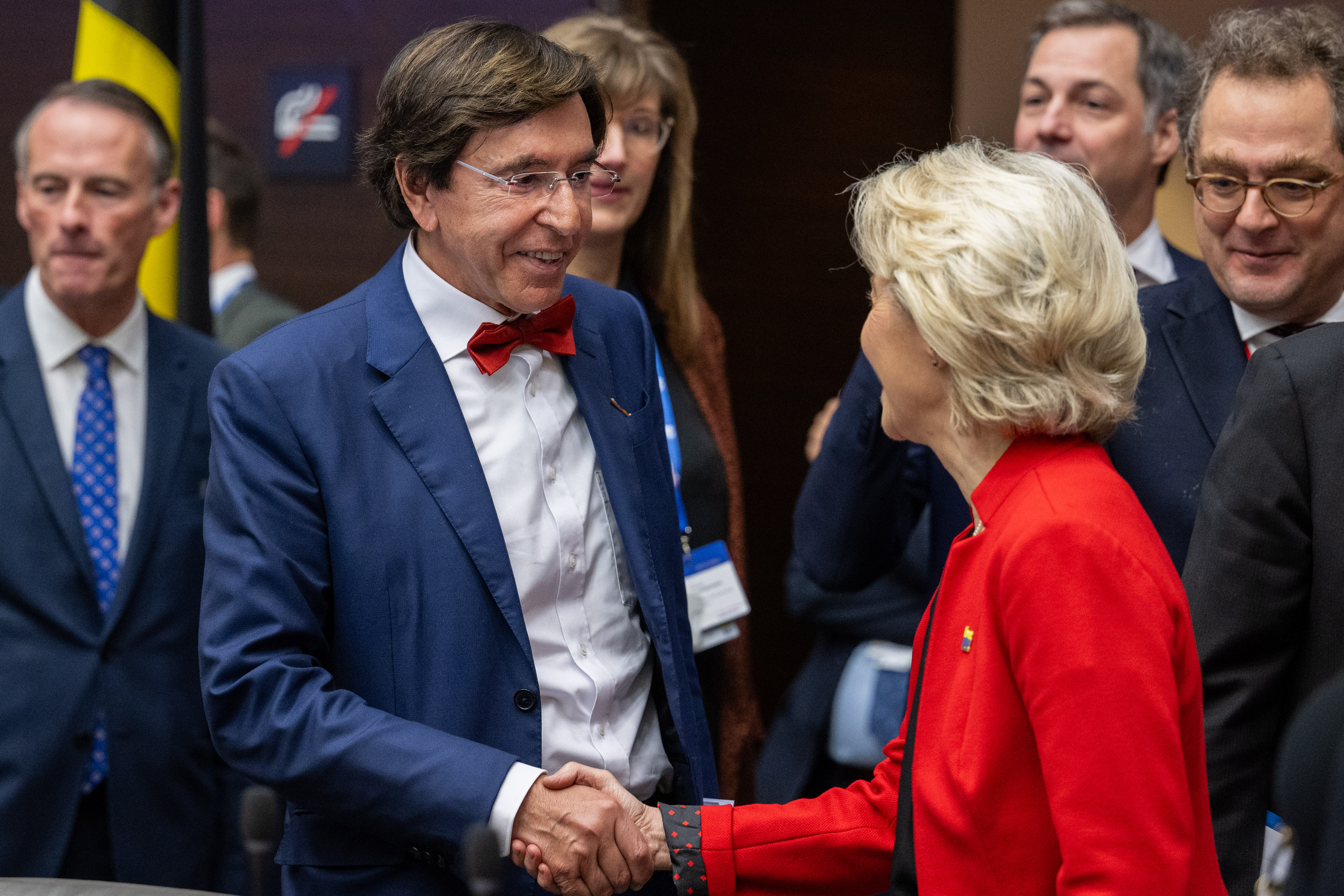
Di Rupo meets with President of the European Commission Ursula von der Leyen on 5 January 2024.

Di Rupo describes himself as an "atheist, rationalist, and Freemason." He is fluent in Italian, French and English. After becoming prime minister, he took Dutch lessons to address his previous limited fluency in the language and this improved enough for him to be able to address the parliament in Dutch and conduct TV interviews in the language.

Di Rupo came out in 1996, and when asked by a confrontational "media pack" if he was gay, he responded, "Yes. So what?" In a 2025 interview with the Italian newspaper Il Centro, he stated that he was bisexual. He is the first openly bisexual man to lead a sovereign state, and the first openly bisexual person to win the position through an election.

Between Di Rupo's election and 2013, he was one of the only three openly gay/lesbian or bisexual national heads of government, the other ones being Icelandic Prime Minister Jóhanna Sigurðardóttir, and Luxembourgish Prime Minister Xavier Bettel.

== Honours ==
- Belgium: Knight Grand Cross of the Order of Leopold II
- Belgium: Commander of the Order of Leopold
- Italy: Grand Officer of the Order of Merit of the Italian Republic

== See also ==
- List of the first LGBT holders of political offices
- List of openly LGBT heads of government

== Notes ==
Political offices
Preceded by Guy Coeme	Deputy Prime Minister of Belgium; 1994–1999	Succeeded by Laurette Onkelinx
Preceded by Guy Coeme	Minister of Traffic and Governmental Companies; 1994–1995	Succeeded by Michel Daerden
Preceded by Melchior Wathelet	Minister of Economics and Telecommunications; 1995–1999	Succeeded by Rudy Demotte
Preceded by Robert Collignon	Minister-President of Wallonia; 1999–2000	Succeeded by Jean-Claude Van Cauwenberghe
Preceded by Maurice Lafosse	Mayor of Mons; 2001–2018	Succeeded by Nicolas Martin
Preceded by André Antoine; Acting	Minister-President of Wallonia; 2005–2007	Succeeded by Rudy Demotte
Preceded by Yves Leterme	Prime Minister of Belgium; 2011–2014	Succeeded by Charles Michel
Preceded by Willy Borsus	Minister-President of Wallonia; 2019-present	Incumbent
Party political offices
Preceded by Philippe Busquin	Leader of the Socialist Party; 1999–2011	Succeeded by Thierry Giet; Acting
Preceded by Paul Magnette	Leader of the Socialist Party; 2014-2019	Succeeded by Paul Magnette
