= Paul Magnette =

Belgian politician

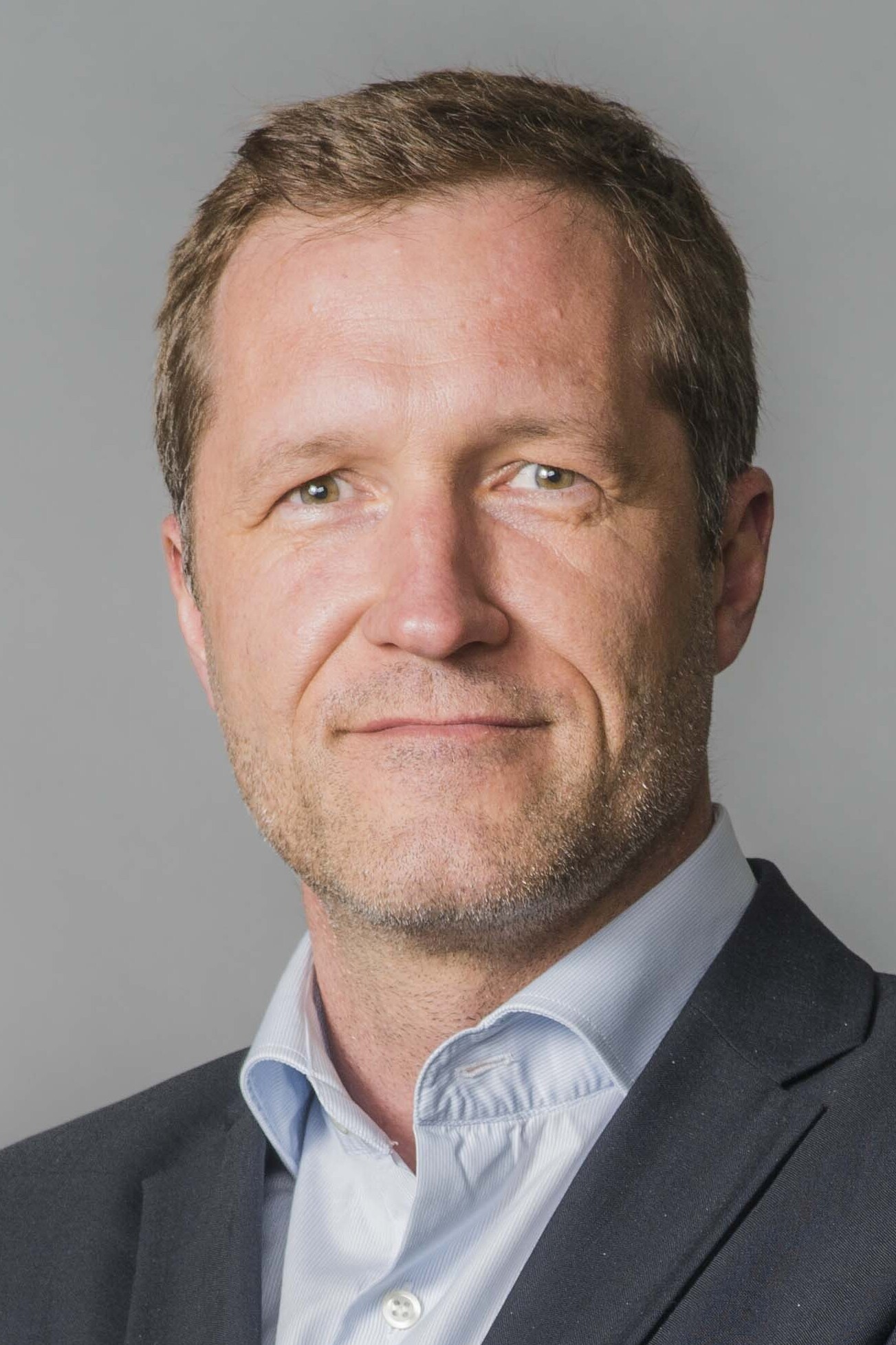
- Magnette in 2021

President of the Socialist Party
- Incumbent
- Assumed office 21 October 2019
- Preceded by: Elio Di Rupo
- In office 17 January 2013 – 22 November 2014
- Preceded by: Thierry Giet
- Succeeded by: Elio Di Rupo

Mayor of Charleroi
- In office 3 December 2012 – 2 December 2024
- Preceded by: Éric Massin
- Succeeded by: Thomas Dermine

Minister-President of Wallonia
- In office 22 July 2014 – 28 July 2017
- Preceded by: Rudy Demotte
- Succeeded by: Willy Borsus

Personal details
- Born: 28 June 1971 (age 55) Leuven, Belgium
- Party: Socialist Party
- Education: Université libre de Bruxelles
- Profession: Professor

Paul Magnette (French pronunciation: [pɔl maɲɛt]; born 28 June 1971) is a Belgian politician. Since 2019, he is the leader of the Socialist Party, a social democratic French-speaking party in Belgium. He was mayor of Charleroi from December 2012 to December 2024. Magnette is a political science professor at the Free University of Brussels (ULB) and Director of the Institute of European Studies of the ULB. He was appointed minister in the Belgian federal government from 2007 to 2013 and was Minister-President of Wallonia from 2014 to 2017. He also was a member of the Senate of Belgium, of the Parliament of Wallonia and of the Parliament of the French Community.

== Biography ==
Born on 28 June 1971 in Leuven, he grew up in Charleroi and studied political science at the Université libre de Bruxelles (1989–1994) and at Cambridge University (1994–1995). He was a researcher at the National Fund for Scientific Research (1995–2001) and obtained a PhD in 1999 with a dissertation Citoyenneté et construction européenne. His research interest is on institutional policies, the European Union, and theories of democracy. In 2000, together with Éric Remacle, he was awarded the Exceptional Francqui Prize for European Research.

In 2001, he was appointed professor of political science at ULB and Director of the Institute of European Studies. He also teaches at the Paris Institute of Political Studies and has been a visiting professor at several European and North American universities. He is the author of numerous publications and is the recipient of several scientific awards. He is also a member of the Royal Academy of Belgium.

On 20 July 2007, Magnette became minister for Health, Social Action and Equal Opportunity of the Walloon government. On 21 December 2007, he became minister for Climate and Energy in the Verhofstadt III federal government. He held the post in the Leterme I Government and held the same post of minister for Climate and Energy in the Van Rompuy I Government, which took office on 30 December 2008, and in the Leterme II Government (25 November 2009 to on 5 December 2011). In the Di Rupo Government, which took office on 6 December 2011, Magnette was Minister for Public Enterprises, Scientific Policy and Development Cooperation until 17 January 2013.

He was elected mayor of Charleroi during the elections of October 2012 and three months later, he was named President of the Socialist Party. Following the regional elections in 2014, he was elected Minister-President of the Walloon government. He won renown notably through his opposition to the CETA free-trade agreement.

Dismissed following a motion of censure in 2017, he returned to his mayoral position and was re-elected at the October 2018 elections. In October 2019, he again returned to the role of President of the Socialist Party. The King entrusted him with the role of informant to gather information regarding the formation of a new government, then (together with Bart De Wever) the role of 'pré-formateur' to pave the way for a new government, and finally, 'co-formateur' (with Alexander Decroo) and thereby contribute to forming a new federal government which took up its role in October 2020.

=== Personal life ===
His parents met in Leuven when they were students and then moved to Charleroi, to the multi-cultural working class district of Marchienne-au-Pont. His mother, a lawyer, was always heavily involved in social issues. His father, a doctor, created the first medical centres in Belgium. With communist parents, driven by the post-May 68 struggles, Paul Magnette grew up in a resolutely left-wing political environment. Together, his parents founded "L'autre Maison" in Roux, a place where the most disadvantaged could find doctors, lawyers, physiotherapists and nurses. His father died of an illness at the young age of 39. Paul Magnette was just 17 years old at the time, the eldest of two brothers and a sister.

His first political involvement was his participation in 1985 in the "Touche pas à mon pote" (Hands off my pal!) campaign organised by SOS Racisme (an anti-racist movement).

He first considered studying journalism, but then opted to study political science. At the end of his studies, he devoted his dissertation, published in 1995, to the poet Pier Paolo Pasolini.

Magnette has three children from his first marriage. Since 2014, he and his long-term partner Maude Evrard have had a son.

== Academic career ==
After having written a political science thesis on European citizenship, thanks to authorization from the FNRS, in 1999, he became visiting professor at the Paris Institute of Political Studies. During the academic year 2000–2001, he became lecturer in political science at ULB - the Free University of Brussels and visiting professor at the IEP in Bordeaux. Since the academic year 2001–2002, Paul Magnette was professor of political science at ULB. He was director of the Institute of European Studies at ULB from 2001 to 2007. He was also visiting professor at the Sant’Anna School of Advanced Studies in Pisa in 2002, the University of Lausanne in 2005, and the European University Institute in Florence during the same year. A Jean Monnet Chair ad personam was attributed to him in 2003. He is also a member of the Royal Academy of Belgium.

A specialist in the constitutionalisation of the European Union and in theories of democracy, he is also engaged in the Belgian political system.

Paul Magnette is the author and co-author of some 30 books and more than one hundred scientific chapters and articles, notably in collaboration with Olivier Costa, Renaud Dehousse, Justine Lacroix and Kalypso Nicolaïdis. He has been invited to present scientific papers at academic conferences in more than 50 universities.

He has also written regular columns in several newspapers such as De Morgen and De Standaard over a period of several years.

== Political career ==
=== Federal political career ===
After the legislative elections of 10 June 2007, Elio Di Rupo, who was then President of the Walloon Socialist Party, asked Paul Magnette to take on a mediation role in the town of Charleroi, where several members of the college of aldermen had been charged. He managed to obtain the resignation of the persons who had been charged and reached a new majority agreement. Several weeks later, he became the Minister for Health, Social Action and Equal Opportunity for Wallonia.

Five months later, on 21 December 2007, Paul Magnette was appointed Federal Minister for Climate and Energy, which included sustainable development and the environment in his responsibilities, in the government Verhofstadt III and the first Leterme government. With this federal scope of activities, Paul Magnette re-established the balance of power between the State and the multinational Electrabel in the battle over the "nuclear rent": after a long power struggle, he obtained a contribution from the nuclear energy producers to the federal budget to compensate the accelerated amortization of the nuclear power plants. Contested by the nuclear power producers, this contribution was validated, after three years of legal disputes, by the Constitutional Court, with the Ministry of Energy winning the case. This contribution facilitated a major investment in offshore wind turbines, on the one hand and a significant social energy policy on the other hand.

As the initiator of the "Environmental Spring" project, he encouraged the different regions to coordinate their environmental policies and combat global warming more effectively. He represented Belgium at the Copenhagen Conference where he pleaded energetically for ambitious goals in the fight against global warming. President of the Council of Ministers for Energy and Climate of the European Union during the Belgian presidency in 2010, he urged notably that the European Union pledge to reach 100% renewable energy by 2050. To this end, he initiated collaboration among nine European countries aimed at creating the largest offshore wind turbine park in the world. At the time of the legislative elections of 13 June 2010, he was head of the list for the Socialist Party in the Senate, which recorded an increase of three points and two elected candidates; Paul Magnette's personal result was 264,167 votes, which made it one of the largest 'voting machines' of the country, and made him 'Man of the Year' for the magazine Le Vif.

After a long period of political crisis, the federal government of Elio Di Rupo was finally established on 6 December 2011. Paul Magnette then became Federal Minister for Public Works, Scientific Policy and Development Cooperation. In particular, in this role, he obtained limits on salaries of senior executives of state-owned companies, thereby restoring an ethical code at the heart of the economy.

=== Mayor of Charleroi ===
At the municipal elections of 14 October 2012, he ran as head of the Socialist Party list in Charleroi and he won an absolute majority of 30 out of 52 seats and was thus elected as mayor with more than 24,000 nominative votes. He was re-elected for a second term of office in October 2018.

He presented a project for the town focused on revitalizing historical urban centers, soft mobility, supporting culture as a tool for revitalization and reinforcing nature in the city. Inspired by the successful experiments run by the socialist mayors of Antwerp and Ghent, he created the post of Charleroi Bouwmeester (municipal master builder), a first for Wallonia. Georgios Maïllis was appointed to this position in 2013 and was reappointed for a second term in 2018 in order to lead a series of architectural and urban sites as well as cultural and graphic arts projects.

A vast restructuration project in the north-west sector of the town centre, called Charleroi's Creative District, was launched in June 2014 with support from the European Regional Development Fund. The goal is the development of a training campus for life-long learning covering all ages. As for the down-town area, it is subject to a perimeter of urban land consolidation creating a mixed district of offices and residential buildings in a vast perimeter composed of residential tower blocks and an administrative city, adjoining the renovated zone around the Rive Gauche commercial centre. These two projects make the transformation of Charleroi one of the most important urban renovation sites in Europe.

In March 2017, Paul Magnette presented the Plan CATCH Catalysts for Charleroi, coordinated by Thomas Dermine, targeting the growth of employment in the Charleroi region between 2017 and 2025, and the creation of 10,000 jobs on the redeveloped site of Caterpillar at Gosselies. Paul Magnette obtained permission for this project following a prolonged struggle with the American multinational company, with the restitution of the site being free of cost in order to allow it to be restructured. Several sectors will be developed or reinforced, such as the airport and logistics activities, creativity sector, digital sector, healthcare, and the Biopark centre of excellence devoted to different biotechnologies. The emphasis of the presence of nature in the city is the other leading project of the 2018–2024 legislature, covering the restructuring of the banks of the river Sambre, the intensification of nature zones and the development of a food belt within the framework of the metropolis. The fight against child poverty is also at the very heart of the town project: Paul Magnette has introduced free pre-school and after-school care in schools and instituted free meals for children in kindergarten.

The participation of the citizen is at the heart of municipal policy. The town has set up a citizens’ municipal council, participatory councils and district intermediaries and has even increased the participatory budgets. Within the scope of the economic consequences of the COVID-19 pandemic, in June 2020, the municipality decided that every inhabitant would receive the equivalent in local currency, the Carol’Or, of 20 euro. An amount of 4 million euro has been released, thus making the Carol’Or the most widespread local currency in Europe.

His tenure ended in December 2024 following the election, in which he chose to run but declined to assume the mayoral position, instead allowing Thomas Dermine to take the role. He said he would devote himself to leading the opposition within the future government in Wallonia and at the federal level.

=== Minister-President of the Walloon Government ===
After the regional elections of 25 May 2014, Paul Magnette became Minister-President of the Government of Wallonia.

In October 2016, on behalf of the Belgian government and at the end of several sessions of discussions, reflections and hearings, he opposed the signing of CETA (Comprehensive Economic and Trade Agreement) between the European Union and Canada, thereby blocking the ratification process which postponed the European Union-Canada summit during which the treaty was to be officially signed on 27 October 2016, to the great displeasure of the other members of the European Union and of Canada. Several foreign media channels made reference to the speech he gave in the Walloon Parliament on 14 October 2016, particularly in France where he was the subject of a special programme on the Arte channel.

On 28 July 2017, Paul Magnette was obliged to leave his position after a reversal of the alliance. He chose to abandon his position as a Walloon deputy in order to continue his role as mayor of Charleroi, thereby respecting his pledge with regard to not holding a dual mandate.

=== President of the Socialist Party ===
In October 2019, Paul Magnette, the only candidate, was elected President of the Socialist Party by the militants with 95.4% of the votes cast.

After Belgium had had no Federal Government for 164 days, King Philippe entrusted Paul Magnette with the task of gathering information in order to establish a majority coalition. Submitting his final report to the sovereign during an audience at the royal palace on 9 December, he requested that he be released from his mission, considering that he had done the groundwork for convergence and solutions.

On 20 July 2020, Paul Magnette was entrusted – together with the President of the Nieuw-Vlaamse Alliantie (N-VA), Bart De Wever – by King Philippe "to take necessary initiatives leading to the establishment of a government based on a broad parliamentary majority". This mission, entrusted to the leaders of the first francophone party and the first Flemish party, resembles the role of a 'formateur' without the term being used explicitly, and while the government was not handling every day affairs, which constituted a most unusual state of affairs. Paul Magnette indicated that he had given himself 50 days to complete the task and his priorities were the preparation of an emergency plan in case there was another wave of the COVID-19 pandemic, a relaunch plan to ensure the transition of the economy after the health crisis, the consolidation of social security and the clarification of the institutional system.

On 25 September 2020, the Belgian monarch put Paul Magnette and the Deputy Prime Minister of the Dutch-speaking Federal Liberal party, Alexander De Croo, in charge of forming the new federal government, based on the "Vivaldi coalition" which brings together socialists, Christian democrats (Flemish party only), liberals and the green party. The negotiations were completed six days later and the federal government was established on 1 October 2020.

He was elected to the Belgian Federal Parliament in the 2024 Belgian federal election.

In July 2024, Magnette became a member of the Belgian Chamber of Representatives.

== Orders ==
- Japan : Imperial Order of the Rising Sun, 3rd Class. Imperial Decree of 2016.
- Denmark : Knight Grand cross in the Order of the Dannebrog in 2017.
- Belgium : Grand officer of the Order of Leopold, Royal decree of 2019; he was commander since 2010.

== Publications ==
- De l'étranger au citoyen, construire la citoyenneté européenne, De Boeck Université, series "L'homme, l'étranger" (direction) 1997.
- De Maastricht à Amsterdam, L’Europe et son nouveau traité, Complexe, series Études européennes (co-direction), 1998.
- Union européenne et nationalités - Le principe de non-discrimination et ses limites, Bruylant (co-direction), 1999.
- Gouverner la Belgique - Clivages et compromis dans une société complexe, PUF, series "Politiques d’aujourd’hui" (co-direction), 1999.
- À quoi sert le Parlement européen? - Stratégies et pouvoirs d’une assemblée transnationale, Complexe, series "Études européennes" (co-direction), 1999.
- La citoyenneté européenne - Droits, politiques, institutions, Éditions de l’Université de Bruxelles, series "Études européennes", 1999.
- La constitution de l'Europe, Bruxelles, Éditions de l'Université de Bruxelles, series "Études européennes", (direction), 2000.
- Le nouveau modèle européen, Vol. I, Institutions et gouvernance, Vol. II, Politiques et relations extérieures, Brussels, Éditions de l'Université de Bruxelles, 2000, 174 + 242 pag., (co-direction with Éric Remacle).
- Le souverain apprivoisé, l'Europe, L'État et la démocratie, Bruxelles, Complexe, series "Études européennes", 2000, ISBN 9782870278147
- La citoyenneté - Une histoire de l'idée de participation civique, preface by John Dunn, Brussels, Bruylant, 2001.
- La constitution de l'Europe, Brussels, Éditions de l'Université de Bruxelles, series "Études européennes", (direction), 2002.
- The Convention on the Future of Europe, Working Towards a Constitution, London, Federal Trust, 2003, with Jo Shaw, Lars Hoffmann e Anna Vergès Bausili.
- Le régime politique de l’Union européenne, Paris, Presses de Sciences Po, 2006, ISBN 9782724620658
- Contrôler l’Europe - Pouvoir et responsabilités dans l’Union européenne, Brussels, Éditions de l’Université de Bruxelles, series « Études européennes», 2003.
- La grande Europe, Brussels, Éditions de l'Université de Bruxelles, Collection de l'Institut d'études européennes, (co-direction), 2004.
- Vers un renouveau du parlementarisme? co-editing with O. Costa and E. Kerrouche, Brussels, Éditions de l’Université de Bruxelles, (co-direction), 2004.
- What is the European Union?, Basignstoke, Palgrave, 2005.
- Citizenship - The history of an Idea, London, ECPR Book Series, 2005 ISBN 9780954796655
- Au nom des peuples, le malentendu constitutionnel européen, Paris, éditions du Cerf, 2006.
- Judith Sklar : le libéralisme des opprimés, Éditions Michalon, 2006, ISBN 9782841863327
- Grandeur et misère de l'idée nationale, Liège, Luc Pire, 2011.
- La Gauche ne meurt jamais, Liège, Luc Pire, 2015.
- Pasolini ou la raison poétique suivi de Pasolini politique, series "Essais", Éditions L’Arbre à paroles, Brussels, 2016.
- CETA Quand l'Europe déraille, Liège, Luc Pire, 2017, ISBN 9782507054847
- Voyage à Charleroi, Liége, Luc Pire, 2018, ISBN 9782875421593
- Le chant du pain, petit traité de l'art boulanger, photos Jean-Pierre Gabriel, Renaissance du Livre, Waterloo, 2019, ISBN 9782507056506
- La vie large. Manifeste écosocialiste, éditions La Découverte, 2022, ISBN 978-2348075025
- L'autre moitié du monde. Essai sur le sens et la valeur du travail, éditions La Découverte, 2024, ISBN 978-2348081965

== See also ==
- List of foreign ministers in 2017
- List of current foreign ministers

Political offices
Preceded by Marc Verwilghen	Minister of Climate and Energy; 2007–2011	Succeeded by Melchior Wathelet
Preceded by Vincent Van Quickenborne	Minister of Public Enterprises and Development Cooperation; 2011–2013	Succeeded by Jean-Pascal Labille
Preceded by Éric Massin	Mayor of Charleroi; 2012–2024	Succeeded by Thomas Dermine
Preceded by Rudy Demotte	Minister-President of Wallonia; 2014–2017	Succeeded by Willy Borsus
Party political offices
Preceded by Thierry Giet; Acting	Leader of the Socialist Party; 2013–2014	Succeeded by Elio Di Rupo
Preceded by Elio Di Rupo	Leader of the Socialist Party; 2019–current	Incumbent
