= Bettincourt =

Village in Liège Province, Wallonia, Belgium

Coordinates: 50.71°N 5.23°E

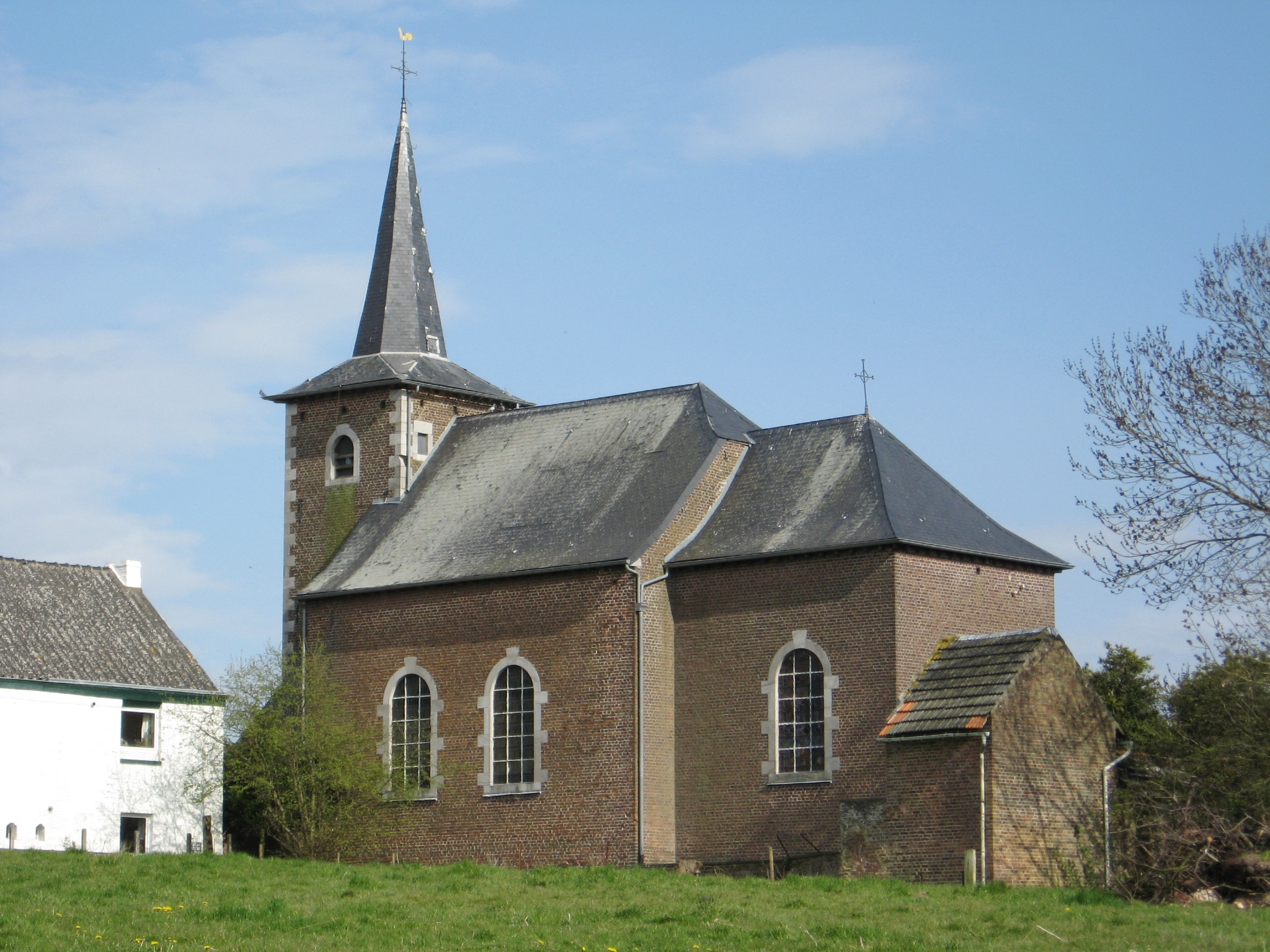
Church of Saint Lambert in Bettincourt, Waremme, Liège, Belgium

Bettincourt (French pronunciation: [bɛtɛ̃kuʁ]; Walloon: Betincoû; Dutch: Bettenhoven) is a village of Wallonia and a district of the municipality of Waremme, located in the province of Liège, Belgium.

The village was a municipality of its own before the 1977 fusion of municipalities.

Its church is dedicated to Saint Lambert.

The Dutch name of the village, Bettenhoven, is possibly the origin of the surname of the famous late-Classical and early-Romantic German composer Ludwig van Beethoven.

Guy Coëme, a Francophone Belgian politician who briefly served as Minister-President of Wallonia in 1988, was born here.
