= Anselme =

Anselme is both a French masculine given name and surname. Notable people with the name include:

== Given name ==
- Nicolas Anselme Baptiste (1761–1835), French actor
- Anselme Bellegarrigue (1813–c. 1869), French anarchist
- Anselme Brusa (1899–1969), French rower
- Anselme Chiasson (1911–2004), Canadian priest
- Anselme Délicat, Gabonese footballer and manager
- Anselme Gaëtan Desmarest (1784–1838), French zoologist
- Eugène Anselme Sébastien Léon Desmarest (1816–1889), French zoologist and entomologist
- Jacques Anselme Dorthès (1759–1794), French physician, entomologist and naturalist
- Pierre-Anselme Garrau (1762–1829), French lawyer and politician
- Gilbert Anselme Girouard (1846–1885), Canadian politician
- Anselme Jourdain (1731–1816), French physician
- Anselme Laugel (1851–1928), French author and politician
- Louis-Anselme Longa (1809–1869), French painter
- Anselme Mathieu (1828–1895), French poet
- Anselme-Homère Pâquet (1830–1891), Canadian politician
- Anselme Payen (1795–1871), French chemist
- Anselme de Peellaert (1864–1817), French politician
- Anselme Riedlé (1765–1801), French horticulturalist
- Bernard-Anselme d'Abbadie de Saint-Castin (1689–1720), French military officer
- Anselme Selosse, French winemaker
- François-Xavier-Anselme Trudel (1838–1890), Canadian politician

== Surname ==
- Antoine Anselme (1652–1737), French priest
- Bernard Anselme (born 1945), Belgian politician
- Éric Anselme (born 1978), French rugby player
- Louise Anselme d'Ataïde (1815–1853), French poet and revolutionary
- Marcel Anselme (1925–1982), French painter and engraver
- Wedson Anselme (born 1986), Haitian footballer

== See also ==
- Anselm (disambiguation)
