= Éric Remacle =

Belgian scientist and professor

Éric Remacle (Forest, Brussels, 1960 – 22 May 2013) was a Belgian scientist and professor at the Department of Political Sciences of the Universite Libre de Bruxelles (ULB). In 2000, together with Paul Magnette, he was awarded the Exceptional Francqui Prize for European Research.

He is to be distinguished from psychologist Éric Remacle (born 1966) author of Le bonheur ou le stress.
