= Élysette =

Executive seat of the Government of Wallonia, Belgium

- Elizete
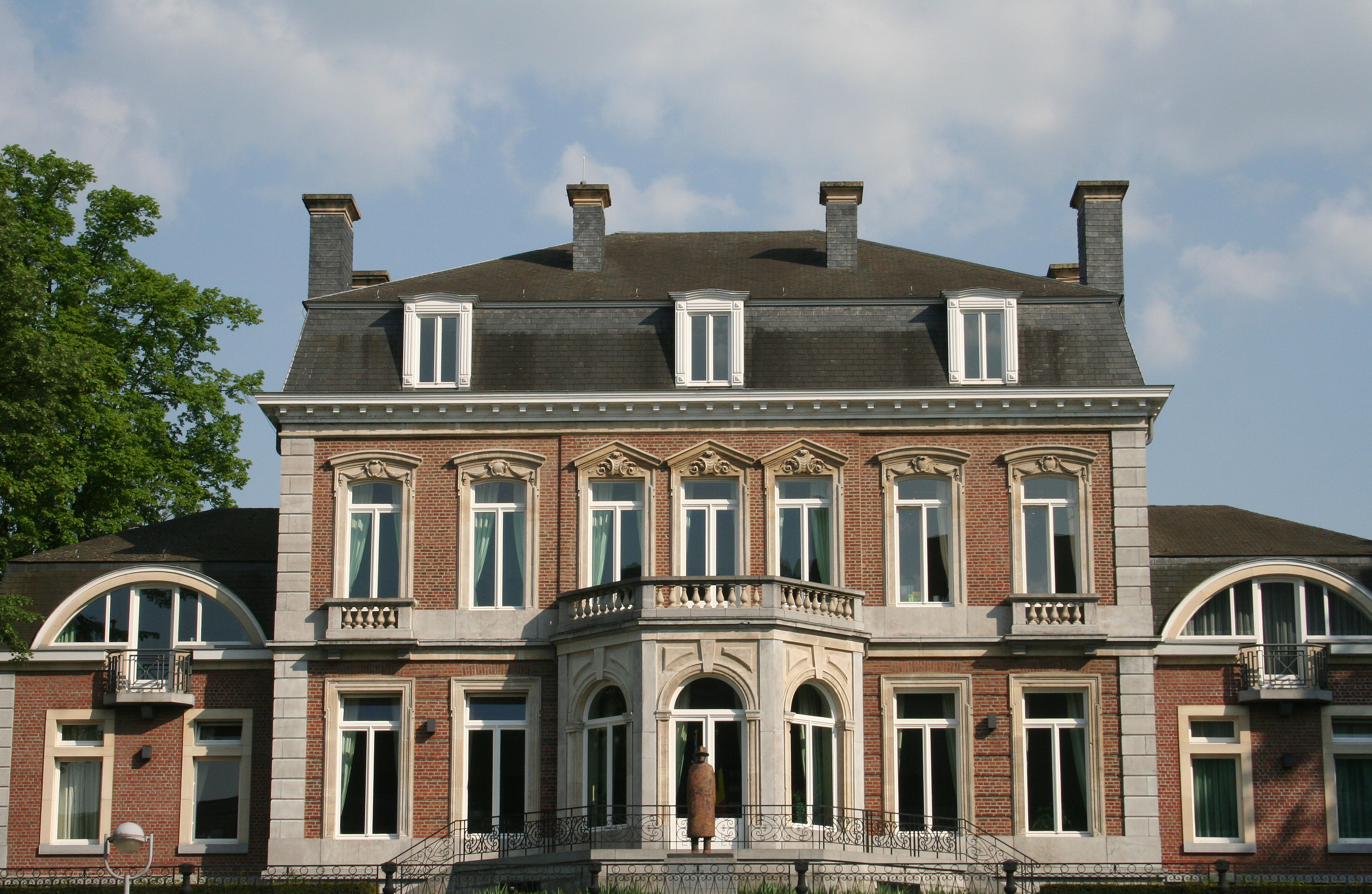
- Interactive map of the Élysette area

General information
- Location: Rue Mazy 25-27; 5100 Jambes, Namur, Belgium
- Coordinates: 50°27′33″N 4°52′08″E
- Construction started: 1877; 149 years ago
- Completed: 1877; 149 years ago

The Élysette (French pronunciation: [elizɛt], Little Élysée; Walloon: Elizete) is the executive seat of the Government of Wallonia. It houses the office of the Minister-President of Wallonia, and is located in Namur, Namur province, Belgium.

== History ==
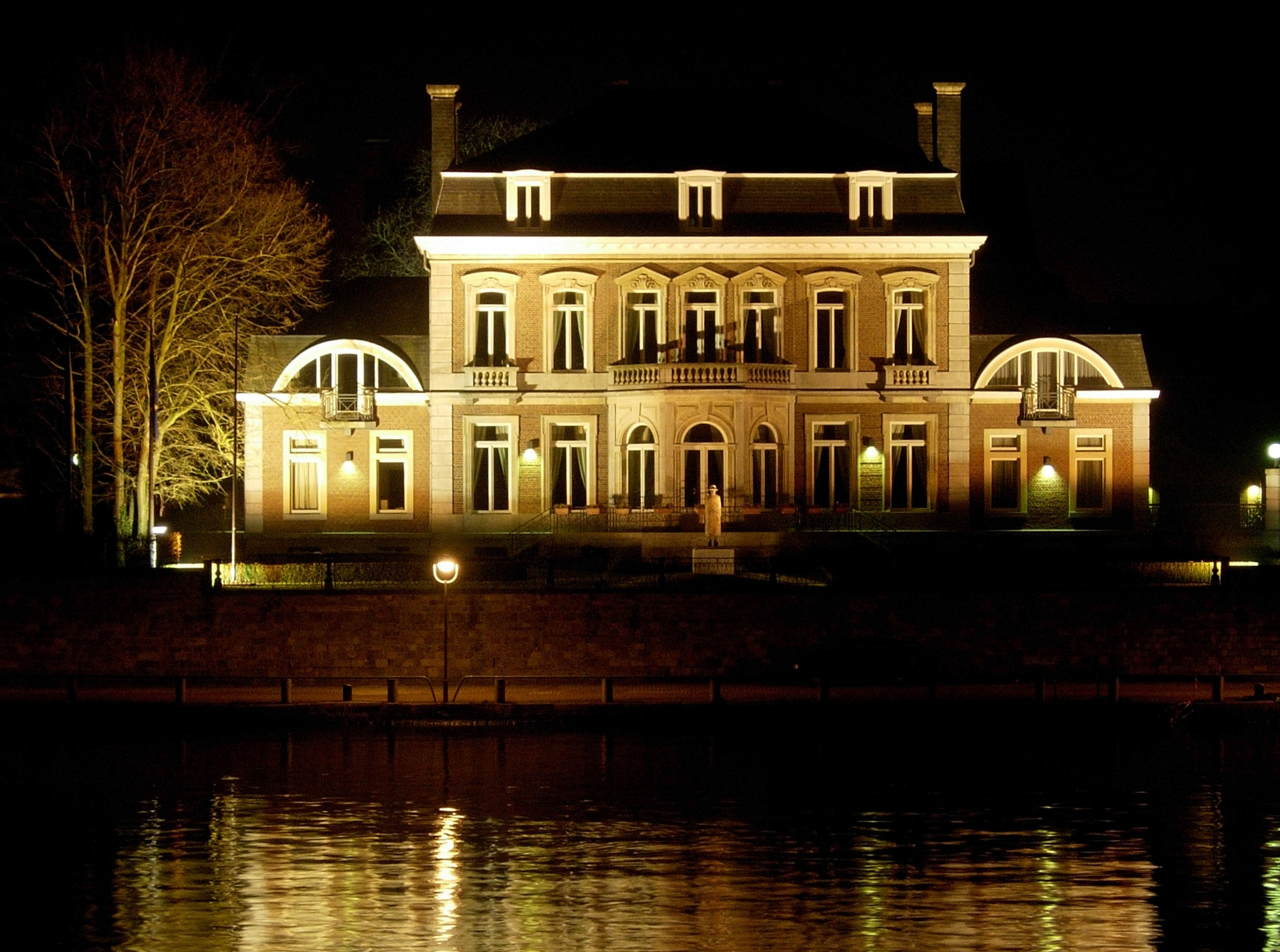
View of the Élysette by night, Meuse side.

Built in 1877 by master-tanner Xavier Thibault, it was bought by the Walloon Region to the city of Namur.

This building, hosting the office of the Minister-President, as well as his official residence, is on the right shore of the Meuse river, in Jambes, the administrative borough of Namur, capital of Wallonia. For the Minister-President's good services, you can find there kitchens, two bedrooms for the servants, garages, offices and meeting rooms (especially the Council of Ministers' Room).

A flat, consisting of a bedroom, a dining room, a bathroom and a living room is next to the Minister-President's Office.

The Élysette faces the Parliament of Wallonia. This one is on the left shore of the river, next to the Grognon (confluence between Meuse and Sambre rivers).
