= Philippe Busquin =

Belgian politician (born 1941)

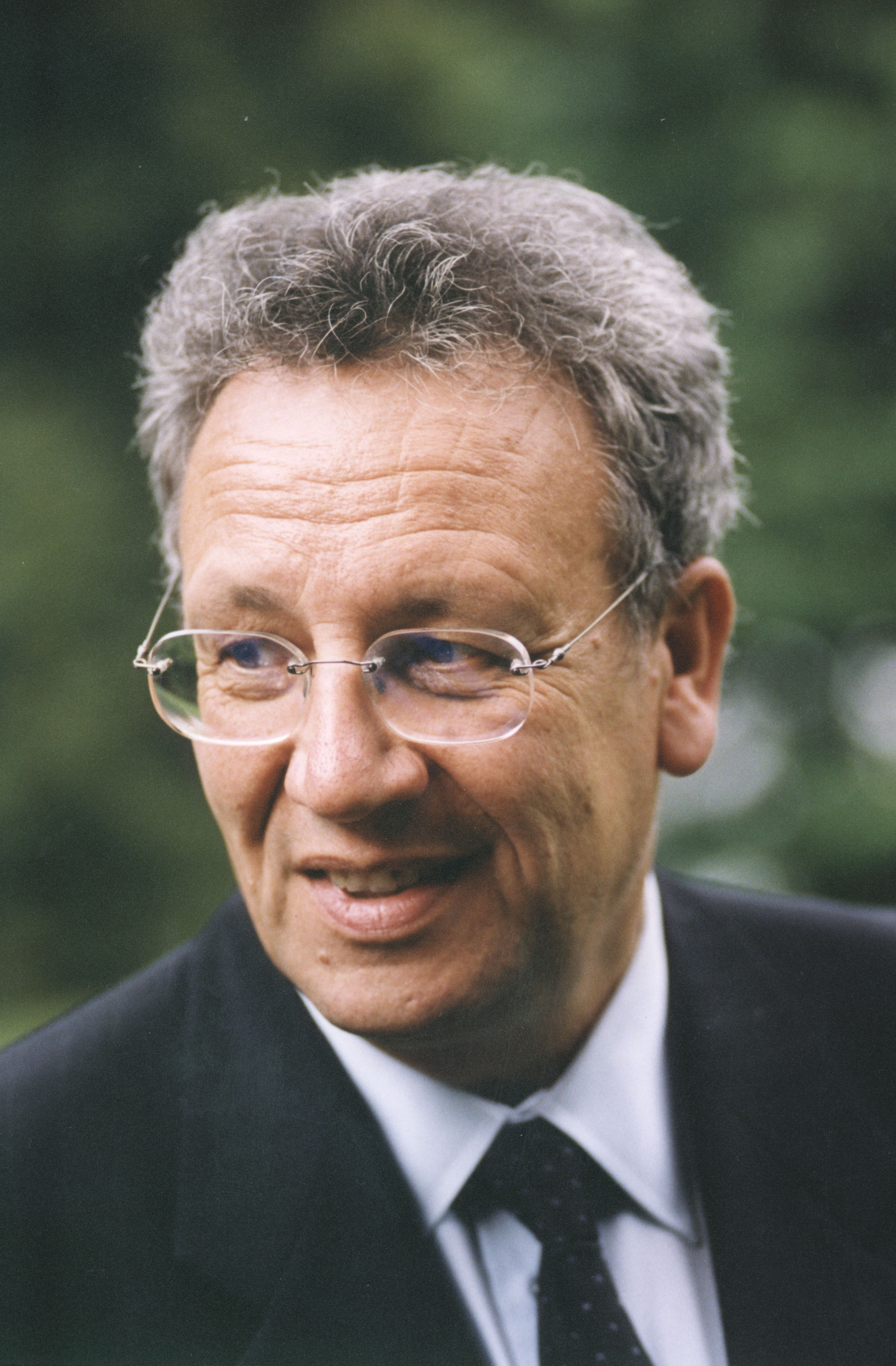
- Official portrait, 1999

European Commissioner for Research
- In office 13 September 1999 – 12 September 2004
- President: Romano Prodi
- Preceded by: Édith Cresson (Research, Science and Technology)
- Succeeded by: Louis Michel

Leader of the Socialist Party
- In office 1992–1999
- Preceded by: Guy Spitaels
- Succeeded by: Elio Di Rupo

Personal details
- Born: 6 January 1941 (age 85) Feluy, Belgium
- Party: Socialist Party
- Education: Free University of Brussels

Philippe Busquin (French pronunciation: [filip byskɛ̃]; born 6 January 1941) is a Belgian politician.

Busquin was born in Feluy. He was a Member of the European Parliament from 2004 to 2009 for the French Community of Belgium with the Parti Socialiste, part of the Socialist Group and sat on the European Parliament's Committee on Industry, Research and Energy. Busquin was the chairman of the Science and Technology Options Assessment Panel. He also was a substitute for the Committee on the Environment, Public Health and Food Safety and a member of the Delegation to the EU-Russia Parliamentary Cooperation Committee. His tendency to stutter has been the subject of satirical videos on YouTube, some garnering hundreds of thousands of hits.

From 1999 to 2004, he was Member of the European Commission with responsibility for research.

== Education ==
- 1962: Degree in physics from the Free University of Brussels
- 1976: Postgraduate certificate in environmental studies
- 1980: First degree in philosophy at the Free University of Brussels

== Career ==
- 1962–1977: Lecturer at the Nivelles teacher training college
- Assistant lecturer at the Free University of Brussels
- 1992–1999: Chairman of the PS
- since 1992: Vice-President of the Socialist International
- 1994–1996: Vice-President of the PES
- 1995–1999: Mayor of Seneffe
- 1977–1978: Ordinary Member for the province of Hainaut
- 1982–1986: Minister for the Budget and Energy for the Walloon Region
- 1986: Minister of Economic Affairs for the Walloon Region
- 1979–1994: Member of the national Parliament
- 1994–1999: Senator
- 1980–1982: Minister of Education
- 1981: Minister of the Interior
- 1987: Minister for Social Affairs
- since 1992: Minister of State
- 1999–2004: Member of the European Commission with responsibility for research
- 2004–2009: Member of the European Parliament (MEP)

== Honours ==
He was awarded:

- Belgium : Grand Cross of the Order of Leopold II (1995)
- Belgium : Commander of the Order of Leopold (1987)
- Belgium : Civic Medal, First Class (1988)
- Honorary Doctorate from Heriot-Watt University (2004)

== See also ==
- 2004 European Parliament election in Belgium

Political offices
Preceded by Karel Van Miert	Belgian European Commissioner; 1999–2004	Succeeded by Louis Michel
Preceded by Édith Cresson as European Commissioner for Research, Science and Technology	European Commissioner for Research; 1999–2004	Succeeded by Louis Michel
Party political offices
Preceded by Guy Spitaels	Leader of the Socialist Party; 1992–1999	Succeeded by Elio Di Rupo
