= Willy Claes =

Belgian politician

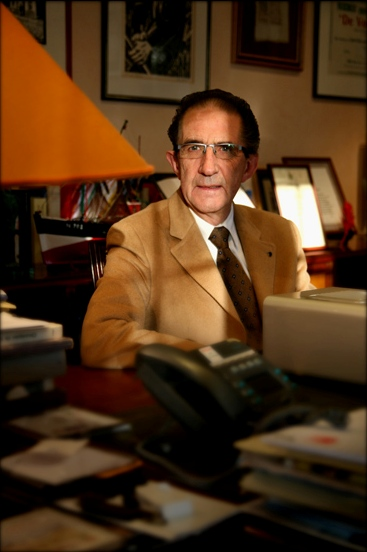
- Claes in 2008

8th Secretary General of NATO
- In office 17 October 1994 – 20 October 1995
- Preceded by: Manfred Wörner; Sergio Balanzino (acting)
- Succeeded by: Sergio Balanzino (acting); Javier Solana

President of the Party of European Socialists
- In office November 1992 – October 1994
- Preceded by: Guy Spitaels
- Succeeded by: Rudolf Scharping

Minister of Foreign Affairs
- In office 7 March 1992 – 10 October 1994
- Prime Minister: Jean-Luc Dehaene
- Preceded by: Mark Eyskens
- Succeeded by: Frank Vandenbroucke

Personal details
- Born: 24 November 1938 (age 87) Hasselt, Belgium
- Party: Socialistische Partij Anders (SP.A)
- Spouse: Suzanne Meynen
- Children: 2
- Education: Vrije Universiteit Brussel

Willem Werner Hubert Claes (Dutch: [ˈʋɪli ˈklaːs]; born 24 November 1938) is a Belgian politician who served as the eighth secretary general of NATO, from 1994 to 1995. Claes was forced to resign from his NATO position after he was found guilty of corruption, which was uncovered during the investigation into André Cools' death. Claes was a member of the Flemish Socialist Party.

== Early life ==
Claes was born in Hasselt, Belgium. He graduated in political and diplomatic sciences at the Vrije Universiteit Brussel (VUB).

== Political career ==
Claes began his political career in the Hasselt city council. In 1968, he was elected to the national parliament. In 1972, he entered the cabinet for the first time as minister of education. Between 1973 and 1992, he was minister of economic affairs of Belgium three separate times. He also served as deputy prime minister five times, and was an important negotiator in the formation of coalition governments during the 1980s.

Claes was Minister of Foreign Affairs from 1992 until 1994 in the Government Jean-Luc Dehaene I, during which period he presided over Belgium's withdrawal from the UN peacekeeping mission in Rwanda during the Rwandan genocide. Belgium's withdrawal and the subsequent proposal by Claes of the withdrawal at the UN of all UN-Troops is thought to have dramatically worsened the situation on the ground, leading to thousands of deaths.

Claes was also Secretary General of NATO from 1994 until 1995, when he resigned after the discovery of a bribe of over 50 million Belgian francs (BEF), accepted at the time he was minister of economic affairs and connected to the defence contract negotiations with Agusta and Dassault. A criminal trial was handled by the Court of Cassation, which is responsible for cases involving minister in function. Claes received a 60 000 BEF fine, a three-year probationary sentence and a five-year prohibition on running for public office. An appeal at the European Court of Human Rights resulted in the confirmation of the Belgian sentence.

== Musical career ==
Claes is known for being a pianist and has frequently performed concerts. Even as secretary-general of NATO, he had a piano in his residence to keep in practice.

== Honours ==
- Minister of State
- Knight Grand Cross of the Order of Leopold II.

Political offices
Preceded by Mark Eyskens	Minister of Foreign Affairs; 1992–1994	Succeeded by Frank Vandenbroucke
Party political offices
Preceded by Guy Spitaels	President of the Party of European Socialists; 1992–1994	Succeeded by Rudolf Scharping
Diplomatic posts
Preceded by Sergio Balanzino; Acting	Secretary General of NATO; 1994–1995	Succeeded by Sergio Balanzino; Acting
