= Agusta scandal =

1990s Belgian corruption scandal

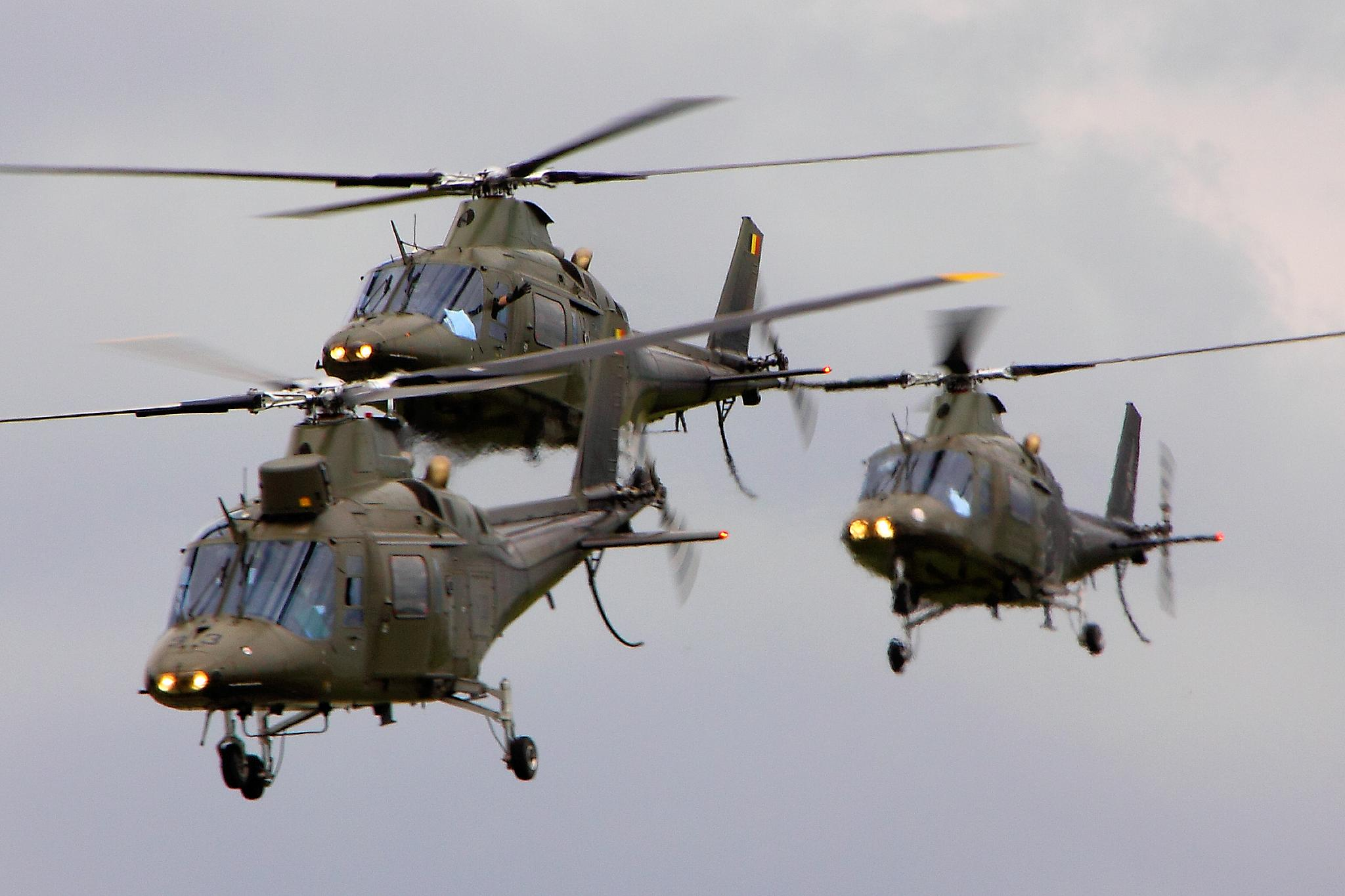
Belgian Army Agusta A109 helicopters which were the subject of the Agusta scandal.

The Agusta scandal (French: Affaire Agusta, Dutch: Agustaschandaal), alternatively known as the Agusta–Dassault Case, was a major political scandal which occurred in Belgium during the mid-1990s. It was based on allegations that aircraft manufacturers Agusta and Dassault had bribed Belgian government officials in 1988 to secure large defence procurement contracts for the Belgian Armed Forces. The Agusta scandal was exposed during investigations into the death of the Parti Socialiste politician André Cools in 1991 and an official enquiry was opened in 1993. Numerous senior figures in both the Parti Socialiste and the Socialistische Partij were implicated, including the incumbent Secretary General of NATO Willy Claes and Minister of Defense Guy Coëme who were forced to resign.

The Agusta scandal was the first of a series of highly-publicised scandals in Belgium during the 1990s, followed by the revelations about the "Hormone Mafia", the Dioxin affair, and the Dutroux affair.

== History ==
=== Investigation and exposure ===
The investigation into the purchase was started by the investigative team looking into the 1991 assassination of André Cools, a politician of the French-speaking Parti Socialiste (PS) and former Deputy Prime Minister of Belgium, when it turned out that Cools had knowledge about the deal. An official investigation into the deal was started in January 1993 by judge Véronique Ancia, when a search warrant was issued for Italian aircraft manufacturer Agusta and its Belgium lobbyist, Georges Cywie. It was discovered that Agusta had bribed high-ranking government officials belonging to the PS and its Dutch-speaking counterpart the Socialistische Partij (SP) to secure a large order of Agusta A109 helicopters for the Belgian Armed Forces. This led to the discovery that French aircraft manufacturer Dassault had also bribed PS and SP politicians for the contract for re-fitting Belgium's F-16 Fighting Falcon fighter jets.

In January 1994, the Senate of Belgium removed the immunity on the Minister-President of Wallonia, Guy Spitaels, and the minister Guy Mathot, both from the PS, and members of the Walloon Government.

Guy Coëme, Deputy Prime Minister and Minister of Transportation for the PS resigned that same month. Frank Vandenbroucke, Minister of Foreign Affairs in the Federal Government for the SP, resigned from his post in March 1994. Willy Claes, member of the SP and Secretary General of NATO, resigned on 20 October 1995.

=== Prosecution ===
A criminal trial was handled by the Court of Cassation, which is responsible for cases involving minister in function. The public prosecutor was Eliane Liekendael. The court had most of its verdicts ready on 23 December 1998. Willy Claes received a three-year probationary sentence and a five-year prohibition on running for public office. Guy Coëme and Guy Spitaels both received three-year probationary sentences with a five-year prohibition on running for public office. Serge Dassault, of the Dassault company, received an 18-month probationary sentence for bribery.

In total, Agusta and Dassault paid more than 160 million francs (about 4 million euros) to the Parti Socialiste and Socialistische Partij in bribes.

== Verdicts ==
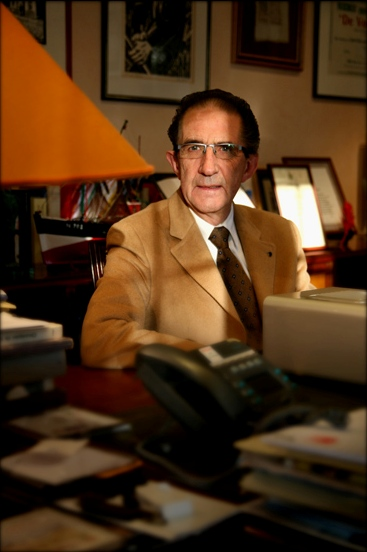
Willy Claes, who was forced to resign his position as Secretary General of NATO over the scandal

Verdicts of the Court of Cassation
Name	Function	Party	Crime (Agusta case)	Crime (Dassault case)	Sentence	Fine (in Belgian francs)
André Bastien	Chief of staff to Coëme	PS	n.a.	passive corruption forgery	6 months' probation	6,000
Willy Claes	Minister of Foreign Affairs	SP	passive corruption	passive corruption	3 years' probation	60,000
Guy Coëme	Minister of Defense	PS	n.a.	passive corruption forgery	2 years' probation	60,000
Serge Dassault	Director, Dassault Group	n.a.	n.a.	active corruption	2 years' probation	60,000
Johan Delanghe	Chief of staff to Claes	SP	passive corruption	passive corruption forgery	18 months' probation	60,000
Auguste Merry Hermanus	Chief of staff	PS	n.a.	passive corruption	1 year's probation	30,000
Etienne Mangé	Treasurer, Socialistische Partij	SP	n.a.	n.a.	1 year's probation	30,000
Jean-Louis Mazy	Deputy chief of staff to Coëme	PS	n.a.	passive corruption forgery	6 months' probation	6,000
Alfons Puelinckx	lawyer	n.a.	passive corruption forgery	passive corruption	2 years' incarceration	60,000
François Pirot	Vice-Secretary, Parti Socialiste	PS	n.a.	passive corruption	3 months' probation	6,000
Guy Spitaels	Chairman, Parti Socialiste	PS	n.a.	passive corruption	2 years' probation	60,000
Luc Wallyn	Secretary, Parti Socialiste	PS	passive corruption forgery	passive corruption	2 years' probation	60,000

The Parti Socialiste had to return 49 million francs in bribes, the Socialistische Partij 111 million francs. Claes, Coëme, Delanghe, Hermanus, Mangé, Puelinckx, Spitaels and Wallyn were also barred from running for political office, or working in the civil service, for five years.

== European Court of Human Rights ==
After the verdicts were handed down, many of the convicted parties applied to the European Court of Human Rights (ECHR) to get the verdicts revoked, because the Court of Cassation in Belgium does not allow for an appeal process, which would have been in violation of the European Convention on Human Rights.

On 2 June 2005, the ECHR judged that in the case of the two ministers, Willy Claes and Guy Coëme, both men were given a lawful trial at the Court of Cassation. The trial of the five others who applied to the ECHR, Dassault, Hermanus, Delanghe, Puelinckx and Wallyn, at the Court of Cassation, was found to have contravened the European Convention on Human Rights, but their verdicts would stand nonetheless.
