= André Cools =

Belgian socialist politician

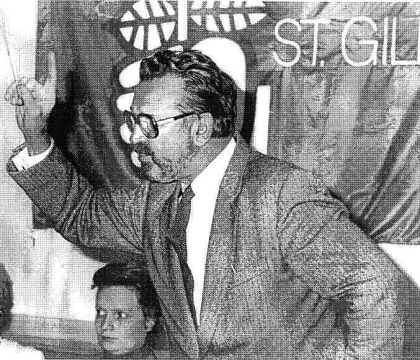

Deputy Prime Minister of Belgium
- In office 22 January 1969 – 26 January 1973
- Monarch: Baudouin
- Prime Minister: Gaston Eyskens
- Preceded by: Joseph-Jean Merlot
- Succeeded by: Willy De Clercq

Minister for the Budget
- In office 1968–1971
- Prime Minister: Gaston Eyskens

Chairman of the Socialist Party
- In office 1978–1981
- Preceded by: Position established
- Succeeded by: Guy Spitaels

Co-President of the Belgian Socialist Party
- In office 1973–1978 Serving with Jos Van Eynde, Willy Claes and Karel Van Miert
- Preceded by: Edmond Leburton
- Succeeded by: Party abolished

Personal details
- Born: 1 August 1927 Flémalle-Grande, Liège, Belgium
- Died: 18 July 1991 (aged 63) Liège, Liège, Belgium
- Cause of death: Assassination
- Party: Socialist
- Other political affiliations: Belgian Socialist (until 1978)
- Domestic partner: Marie-Hélène Joiret

André H.P. Cools (French pronunciation: [ɑ̃dʁe kols]; 1 August 1927 – 18 July 1991) was a Belgian politician and a senior figure within the Walloon Socialist Party (PS) in the Liège region. He was assassinated in 1991 and the subsequent investigation uncovered widespread graft within Belgium's two socialist parties.

== Political career ==
André Cools was born on 1 August 1927 in Flémalle-Grande to a family of trade unionist activists. His father, Marcel Cools, was a member of the Belgian Labour Party and the Belgian Resistance, and was deported to Mauthausen concentration camp, where he was executed. André joined the Belgian Socialist Party in 1945, and during the royal question crisis he advocated for the abolition of the monarchy.

Cools was the Belgian budget minister from 1968 to 1971, Deputy Prime Minister from 1969 to 1972, head of the Walloon section of the Belgian Parti Socialiste (PS) from 1973 to 1978, chairman of the national party from 1978 to 1981, president of the Walloon Council from 1982 to 1985, and minister of the government of the Walloon Region from 1988 to 1990. He was also given the honorific title of Minister of State in 1983. In 1990 he retired from the national political scene after an internal power struggle within the PS but he remained influential in the local party in Liège.

Cools was noted for his pithy pronouncements. For example, when in 1984 he commented on who he thought the four greatest United States presidents had been, he said: 'Roosevelt, Roosevelt, Roosevelt and Roosevelt'.

His nickname was "Le maître de Flémalle" ("Master of Flémalle"). Cools had been mayor of Flémalle-Haute from 1964 to 1977 and after the merger with Flémalle from 1977 until his death.

== Death ==
Cools was shot and killed in Liège on 18 July 1991. He was 63 years old.

The investigation into his assassination lead to several scandals involving the French speaking and Flemish speaking socialist parties (like the Agusta-affair).

== Aftermath ==
In 2003, a Liège trial started, accusing Richard Taxquet (former personal chauffeur and secretary for Alain Van der Biest, a Parti Socialiste minister), Giuseppe "Pino" di Mauro, and others of involvement in the Cools murder. In January 2004, Taxquet and di Mauro were sentenced to twenty years' imprisonment.

== See also ==
- Belgian general strike of 1960–1961
- Belgian political scandals
- Parliamentary inquiries by the Belgian Federal Parliament

== Sources ==
- André Cools (in French)
