= Sergio Balanzino =

Italian diplomat (1934–2018)

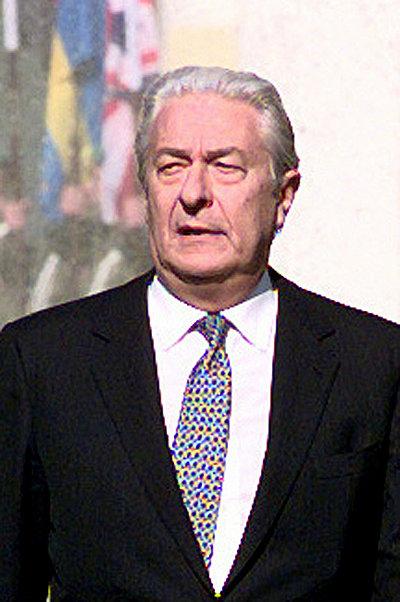
- Balanzino in 1998

Acting Secretary General of NATO
- In office 20 October 1995 – 5 December 1995
- Preceded by: Willy Claes
- Succeeded by: Javier Solana
- In office 13 August 1994 – 17 October 1994
- Preceded by: Manfred Wörner
- Succeeded by: Willy Claes

Deputy Secretary General of NATO
- In office February 1994 – 2001
- Preceded by: Amedeo de Franchis
- Succeeded by: Alessandro Minuto-Rizzo

Personal details
- Born: Sergio Silvio Balanzino; 20 June 1934
- Died: 25 February 2018 (aged 83)
- Education: University of Wisconsin–Madison; Sapienza University of Rome

Sergio Silvio Balanzino (20 June 1934 – 25 February 2018) was an Italian diplomat.

He studied as a Brittingham Foreign Scholar at the University of Wisconsin in Madison 1956–1957. After graduating in Law from the University of Rome La Sapienza he joined the Italian foreign service in 1958.

He served as the Italian ambassador to Canada from May 1990 to January 1994. He then became the deputy secretary general of NATO before briefly becoming the acting secretary general twice. Firstly by replacing Manfred Wörner on 13 August 1994 after the latter resigned in the last stages of cancer. On 17 October 1994, he was replaced by Willy Claes, who resigned on 20 October 1995 following the discovery of his political corruption.

Balanzino, who had gone back to being Deputy, again took over the reins until he was replaced on 5 December 1995 by Javier Solana.

He taught in the springtime at the Loyola University Chicago Rome Center.

== Biography ==
A law graduate from the Sapienza University of Rome, he entered the diplomatic service following a competitive examination in 1959 and served at the Ministry of Foreign Affairs (Italy) in the Directorate General of Economic Affairs. He then served in Paris at the Italian Representation to the OECD, in various consulates in Switzerland and at the Embassy in Nairobi.

He was First Counselor in Athens from 1975 to 1978, consul in Ottawa until 1980 and ambassador of Italy to Canada from 1990 to 1994 appointed by the Sixth Andreotti government.

In February 1994 he was appointed deputy Secretary General of NATO, where he remained until 2001. During the terminal illness of Secretary General Manfred Wörner in 1994 and after the resignation of his successor Willy Claes in 1995, he briefly assumed the interim of the NATO General Secretariat.

He taught at the Loyola University Chicago campus in Rome.

== Honours ==
- Order of Merit of the Italian Republic 1st Class / Knight Grand Cross – January 21, 1999
