= Adrien Dolimont =

Belgian politician (born 1988)

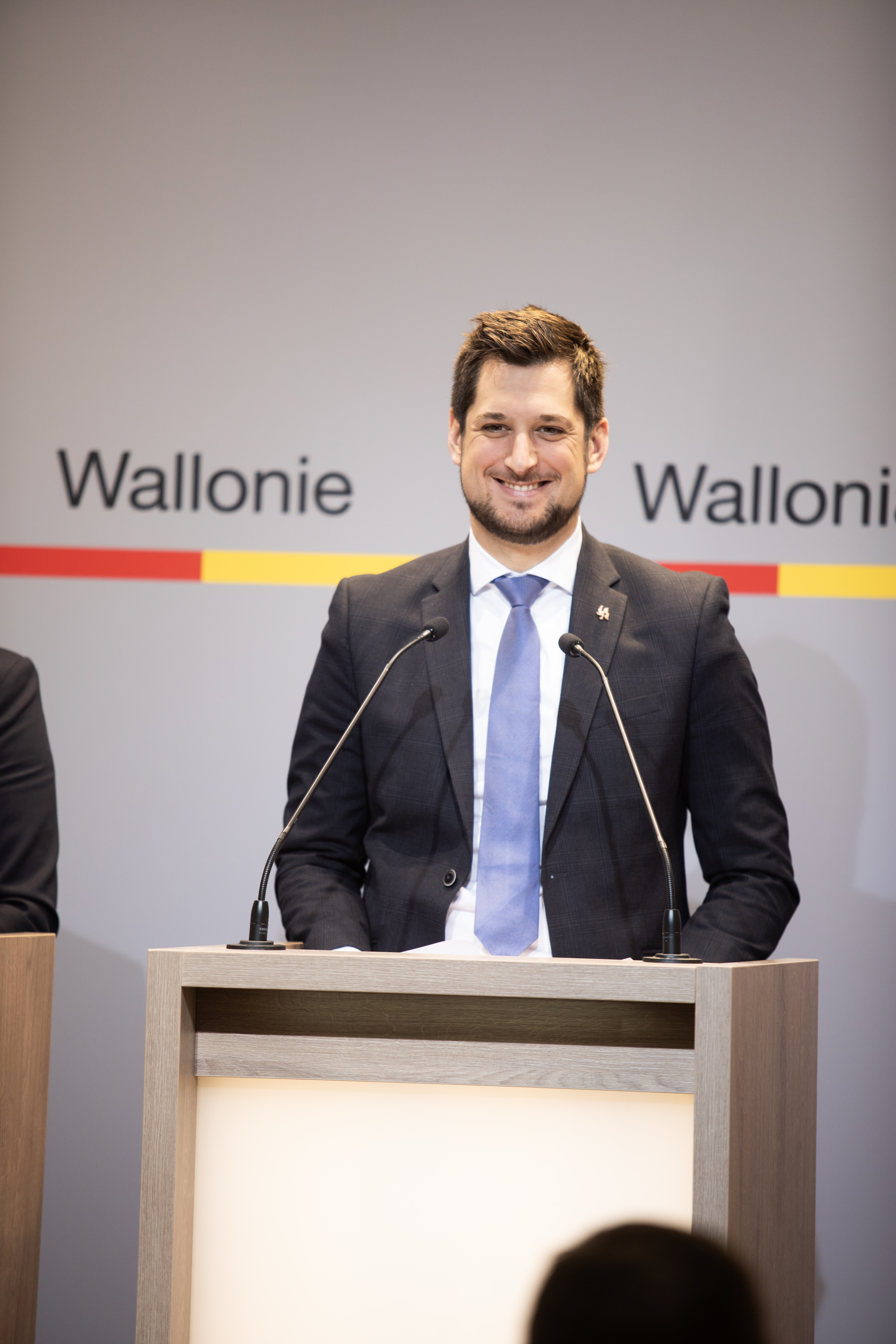

Minister-President of Wallonia
- Incumbent
- Assumed office 15 July 2024
- Preceded by: Elio Di Rupo

Personal details
- Born: 18 September 1988 (age 37)
- Party: Reformist Movement

Adrien Dolimont (born 18 September 1988) is a Belgian politician of the Reformist Movement serving as minister-president of Wallonia since 2024. From 2022 to 2024, he served as budget minister of Wallonia.
