= Bernard Anselme =

Belgian politician (born 1945)

Minister-President of the French Community
- In office 7 January 1992 – 4 May 1993
- Preceded by: Valmy Féaux
- Succeeded by: Laurette Onkelinx

Minister-President of Wallonia
- In office 11 May 1988 – 7 January 1992
- Preceded by: Guy Coëme
- Succeeded by: Guy Spitaels

Personal details
- Born: 3 November 1945 (age 80) Mouscron, Belgium
- Party: Socialist Party
- Education: Free University of Brussels, French

Bernard Anselme (French pronunciation: [bɛʁnaʁ ɑ̃sɛlm]; born 3 November 1945) was the 6th Minister-President of Wallonia in Belgium from 11 May 1988 to 7 January 1992.

== Biography ==
Bernard Anselme was born on 3 November 1945 in Mouscron, Wallonia to a postal worker. After his father was transferred to Libramont-Chevigny, Anselme studied humanities from 1957 to 1963, ending his education in the humanities at Namur in 1963. In 1968, Anselme received a degree in political science, diplomacy and administration from the Université libre de Bruxelles in Brussels. During his time in Brussels, Anselme became involved in the Young FGTB, becoming its assistant secretary in 1964, its secretary in 1968 and serving as its president from 1968 to 1970.

Between 1969 and 1972, Anselme served as the Special Adviser to the Minister for Community Relations, and from 1972 to 1977 served as an adviser to the President of the Walloon Economic Council, Alfred Delourme. In 1977, Anselme became the Member for Namur, serving in various positions before serving as Wallonia's Secretary of State from 1979 to 1980. In 1985, as a member of Wallonia's regional parliament, Anselme authored a decree establishing Namur as the capital of the Walloon Region. In 1988, Anselme became the Minister-President of the Walloon Region, a position he retained until 7 January 1992. From 1994 to 1999 Anselme served as the Minister for Internal Affairs for the Walloon Region, followed by a few months in the position of Minister for Social Affairs.

On 1 January 2001, Anselme became the Mayor of Namur. In October 2006, following the formation of a coalition between the Christian Democrats, Greens and Liberals, Anselme's Socialist Party was ousted from government for the first time in 30 years. Anselme announced his intention to resign from politics following the election defeat, but was convinced to stay in municipal politics. He currently sits as a Namur municipal councillor.

Political offices
Preceded by Guy Coëme	Minister-President of Wallonia; 1988–1992	Succeeded by Guy Spitaels
Preceded by Valmy Féaux	Minister-President of the French Community; 1992–1993	Succeeded by Laurette Onkelinx
