= Willy Borsus =

Belgian politician

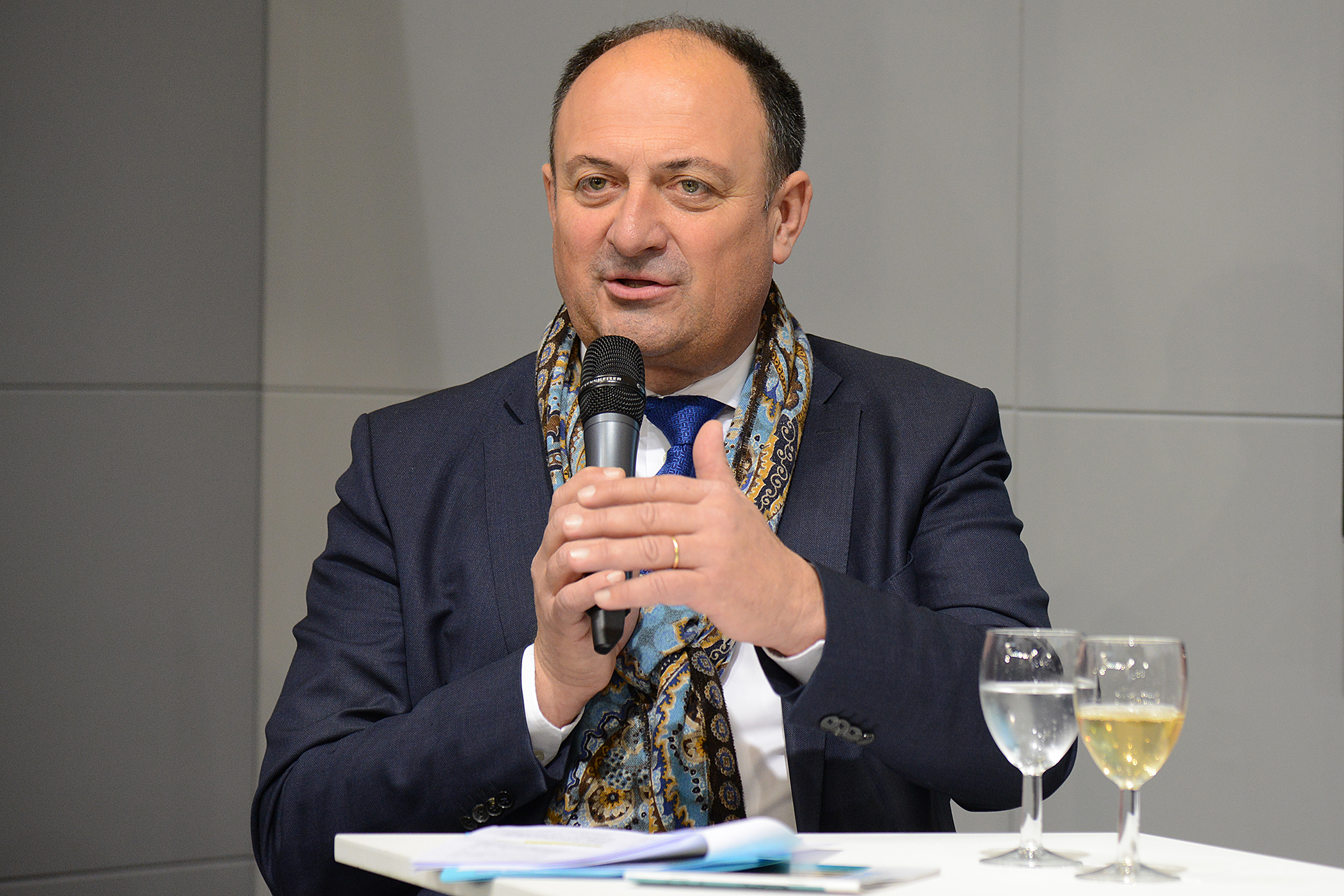
Willy Borsus at the Agriflanders 2017

Willy Borsus (born 4 April 1962) is a Belgian politician. He is a member of the Reformist Movement (MR). He was the 14th Minister-President of Wallonia from the 28th of July 2017 to the 13th of September 2019.

== Political career ==
Political mandates previously or currently held

- 1988–present: Municipal Councillor of Somme-Leuze
- 1995–present: Mayor of Somme-Leuze
- 1994–2004: Provincial Councillor of Namur
  - 1995–2000: President of the Provincial Council of Namur
  - 2000–2004: group leader the Provincial Council of Namur
- 2004–2014: Walloon and French Community MP
  - 2008–2009: First Deputy Chairman of the Parliament of the French Community
  - 2009–2014: Group Leader in the Walloon Parliament
- 2014–2017: Federal Minister for the Middle Classes, Independents, Small and Medium Enterprises, Agriculture and Social Integration in the Michel Government
- 2017–2019: Minister-President of Wallonia
- 2019–2024: Vice-President of Wallonia; Minister of Economy, Foreign Trade, Spatial Planning and Agriculture.
- 2024–heden: Speaker of the Parliament of Wallonia

Political offices
Preceded by Paul Magnette	Minister-President of Wallonia; 2017–2019	Succeeded by Elio Di Rupo
