= Guy Spitaels =

Belgian politician (1931–2012)

Minister-President of Wallonia
- In office 7 January 1992 – 25 January 1994
- Preceded by: Bernard Anselme
- Succeeded by: Robert Collignon

President of the Party of European Socialists
- In office February 1989 – May 1992
- Preceded by: Vítor Constâncio
- Succeeded by: Willy Claes

Leader of the Socialist Party
- In office 1981–1992
- Preceded by: André Cools
- Succeeded by: Philippe Busquin

Personal details
- Born: 3 September 1931 Ath, Belgium
- Died: 21 August 2012 (aged 80) Uccle, Belgium
- Party: Socialist Party
- Education: Catholic University of Leuven

Guy Gustave Arthur Ghislain Spitaels (French pronunciation: [ɡi ɡystav aʁtyʁ ɡilɛ̃ spitals]; 3 September 1931 – 21 August 2012) was a Belgian politician of the Socialist Party. He was the 7th Minister-President of Wallonia from 1992 to 1994 and president of his party for thirteen years, until he was succeeded by Philippe Busquin.

== Career ==
Spitaels graduated in 1957 in political and social sciences at the Universite Catholique de Louvain (UCL), and attended the College of Europe in Bruges 1957–1958. He quit the Roman Catholic faith and became a Freemason. He became a professor in labour law at the Université libre de Bruxelles (ULB).

In the early 1970s Spitaels was chief of staff to various Belgian socialist ministers. After the elections of 1974 Spitaels became a senator. He became mayor of Ath in 1977, an office he held for twenty years. The same year he became minister of Labour under Prime Minister Paul Vanden Boeynants. From 1979 to 1981 Spitaels was deputy prime minister under the governments of Wilfried Martens. He concurrently served as minister of the budget (1979–1980) and minister of transport (1980–1981). After the electoral defeat at the elections of 1981, the PS was relegated to the opposition and Guy Spitaels became party chairman of the PS (1981–1992). In the general elections of 1987 he led his party to electoral victory and back to power.

With him and André Cools, the PS played a leading role in transformation the unitary structures of the Belgian state into a federalist system. The transformation was largely accomplished by 1989 and completely formalized in 1993.

In 1992 Spitaels arranged that he would become Minister-President of the Walloon Government. Along with other politicians from his party, he was involved in the Agusta scandal, which caused his resignation in 1994. In 1995 he was elected President of the Walloon Parliament but he had to resign from this office due to the scandal in 1997. Spitaels was convicted for passive bribery by the Court of Cassation in 1998. His political career would never recover from this scandal.

Before the Agusta scandal he was nicknamed Dieu (French for God), a reference to his great influence within the Parti Socialiste, which was the most powerful party of French-speaking Belgium in those days.

Spitaels died of a brain tumor at age 80 on 21 August 2012.

== See also ==
- 1960–61 Winter General Strike

== Sources ==
- Guy Spitaels

Party political offices
Preceded by André Cools	Leader of the Socialist Party; 1981–1992	Succeeded by Philippe Busquin
Preceded by Vítor Constâncio	Leader of the Party of European Socialists; 1989–1992	Succeeded by Willy Claes
Political offices
Preceded by Bernard Anselme	Minister-President of Wallonia; 1992–1994	Succeeded by Robert Collignon
