= Guy Coëme =

Belgian politician (born 1946)

Minister-President of Wallonia
- In office 3 February 1988 – 9 May 1988
- Preceded by: Melchior Wathelet
- Succeeded by: Bernard Anselme

Personal details
- Born: 21 August 1946 (age 78); Bettincourt, Belgium
- Political party: Socialist Party

Guy Coëme (born 21 August 1946) is a Francophone Belgian politician for the Socialist Party (PS).

He served as 5th Minister-President of Wallonia from February to May 1988.

Coëme served as minister of defence in the government Martens VIII and IX. In the first cabinet Dehaene, he was promoted to deputy prime minister and served as minister of transport. In 1993, he came under pressure due to the Agusta scandal investigation, which led to his resignation in 1994. He was later rehabilitated, and he currently serves as mayor of Waremme. He is a member of the European Parliament elected in the lists of the Socialist Group and is a member of the 'Commission for Culture, Science and Education', of the 'Subcommittee for Energy' and 'Subcommittee for Cultural Heritage'.

== Honours ==
- 2014 : Knight Grand Cross in the Order of Leopold II.

Political offices
Preceded by Melchior Wathelet	Minister-President of Wallonia; 1988	Succeeded by Bernard Anselme
