= Jean-Maurice Dehousse =

Belgian politician (1936–2023)

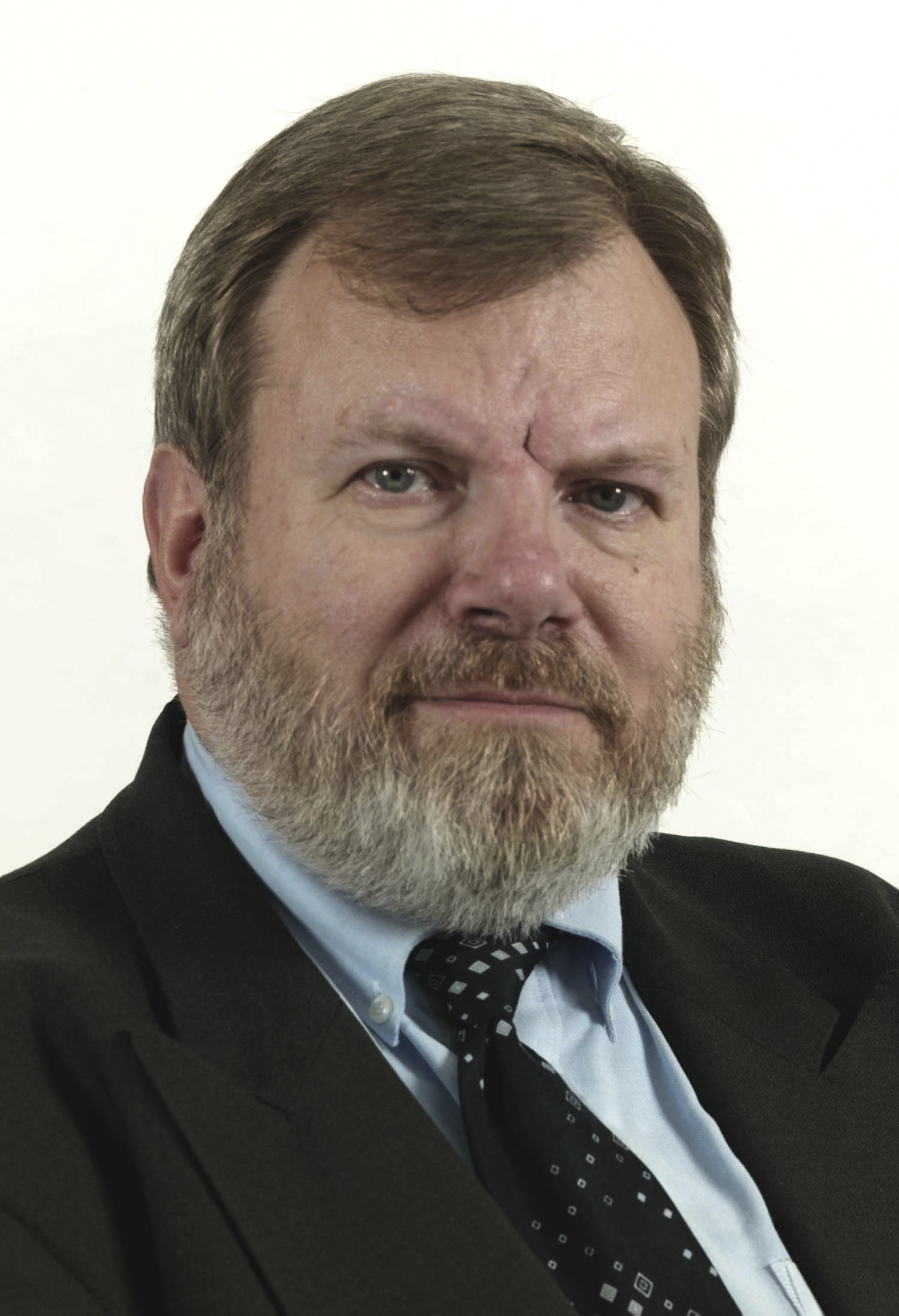
- Dehousse in 1999

Minister-President of Wallonia
- In office 25 October 1982 – 11 December 1985
- Preceded by: André Damseaux
- Succeeded by: Melchior Wathelet
- In office 22 December 1981 – 26 January 1982
- Preceded by: Position established
- Succeeded by: André Damseaux

Personal details
- Born: 11 October 1936 Liège, Belgium
- Died: 9 February 2023 (aged 86)
- Party: Socialist Party
- Children: Renaud Dehousse
- Education: University of Liège; Johns Hopkins University

Jean-Maurice Dehousse (11 October 1936 – 9 February 2023) was a Belgian politician. He was a Member of the European Parliament between 1999 and 2004 as a member of the Parti Socialiste. Dehousse was the first and third Minister-President of Wallonia.

== Life and career ==
Jean-Maurice Dehousse was born in Liège. After receiving his early education in Europe, Dehousse travelled to Beverly Hills, United States, where he studied for one year in 1955. In 1960, he received his Doctor of Laws from University of Liège and a degree in international studies from The Paul H. Nitze School of Advanced International Studies - SAIS of the Johns Hopkins University, in Washington, DC (US) in 1961. From 1962 to 1965, Dehousse worked with the FNRS, the Belgian National Fund for Scientific Research, becoming an assistant at the Institute for European Legal Studies at the University of Liège in 1966. He served as a representative of the General Federation of Belgian Labour whilst at the University of Liège.

In 1971, Dehousse was elected as a Member of Parliament representing Liège, becoming Minister for French Culture in 1977, lasting in that position until 1978. From 1979 to 1985, Dehousse served as a member of the Belgian government in a variety of roles concerning Wallonia. During that period, in 1981, Dehousse was elected as a Senator and became the first Minister-President of the Walloon Region. In 1991, he was appointed Minister for Science Policy, leaving government in 1995 to serve as mayor of Liège. On 16 September 1999, Dehousse became a Member of the European Parliament representing Belgium as a member of the Parti Socialiste. On 19 July 2004, his first and only term expired.

In August 2009, Dehousse underwent prostate surgery at a Belgian hospital. He died on 9 February 2023, at the age of 86.

Political offices
New office	Minister-President of Wallonia; 1981–1982	Succeeded by André Damseaux
Preceded by André Damseaux	Minister-President of Wallonia; 1982–1985	Succeeded by Melchior Wathelet
