= Jean-Claude Van Cauwenberghe =

Belgian politician (born 1944)

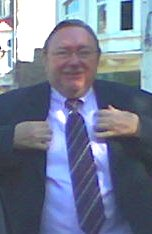

Minister-President of region of Wallonia
- In office 4 April 2000 – 30 September 2005
- Preceded by: Elio Di Rupo
- Succeeded by: André Antoine (Acting)

Personal details
- Born: 28 April 1944 (age 81) Charleroi
- Party: Socialist Party

Jean-Claude Van Cauwenberghe (born 28 April 1944 in Charleroi), nicknamed "Van Cau", is a Belgian politician. He is member of the Parti Socialiste (Socialist Party; PS). He was the tenth Minister-President of Wallonia from 4 April 2000 until 30 September 2005. He resigned amid the ICDI affair and was replaced by Elio Di Rupo. He also served as mayor of Charleroi (1983–2000).

== Notes ==
Political offices
Preceded by Elio Di Rupo	Minister-President of Wallonia; 2000–2005	Succeeded by André Antoine; Acting
