= André Damseaux =

Belgian politician

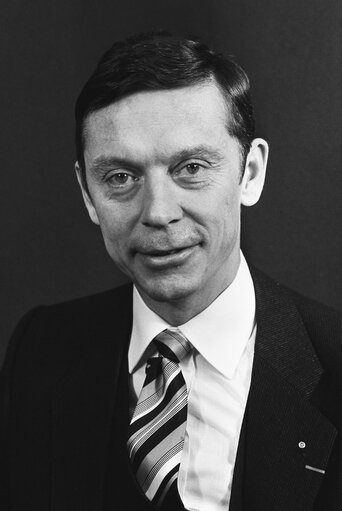

Minister-President of Wallonia
- In office 26 January 1982 – 25 October 1982
- Preceded by: Jean-Maurice Dehousse
- Succeeded by: Jean-Maurice Dehousse

Personal details
- Born: 5 March 1937 Verviers, Belgium
- Died: 29 March 2007 (aged 70) Verviers, Belgium
- Party: Reformist Movement
- Education: University of Liège

André Damseaux (5 March 1937 – 29 March 2007) was a Belgian politician, second Minister-President of Wallonia and Member of the European Parliament.

== Life ==
André Damseaux was born on 5 March 1937 in Verviers, Belgium. In 1961, Damseaux gained a degree in diplomatic science from the University of Liège and a degree in political science from the same university three years later. After working as a journalist with La Meuse newspaper, Damseaux served on the council of Verviers, beginning in 1965. This was a position he would hold for over three decades, ending in 1999.

In 1971, Damseaux began his career in the Parliament of Belgium, a career there which would last until 1999. From 1973 to 1974 Damseaux served as the president of the Liberal Reformist Party in Wallonia. In 1977, Damseaux became a Member of the European Parliament representing Belgium, and became one of the first directly elected Members of the European Parliament in 1979 when direct elections began. In 1981 Damseaux joined the Walloon government, as Minister for External Relations and supervision of municipalities. The same year he began service as the Minister for National Education in the federal government, and in 1982 served as Minister-President of the Walloon Region. However, after suffering protests over his school reforms, Damseaux resigned from his Minister for National Education position on 9 March 1987. From 1989 to 1994 Damseaux was the Mayor of Verviers.

In 1999, Damseaux ceased being a member of the Verviers council, and in 2001 became a member of the Jalhay council. On 29 March 2007 Damseaux died in a Verviers hospital after suffering from a stroke.

Political offices
| Preceded by Jean-Maurice Dehousse | Minister-President of Wallonia; 1982 | Succeeded by Jean-Maurice Dehousse |
