= Minister-President of Wallonia =

Head of the government of Wallonia

- Coat of arms of Wallonia

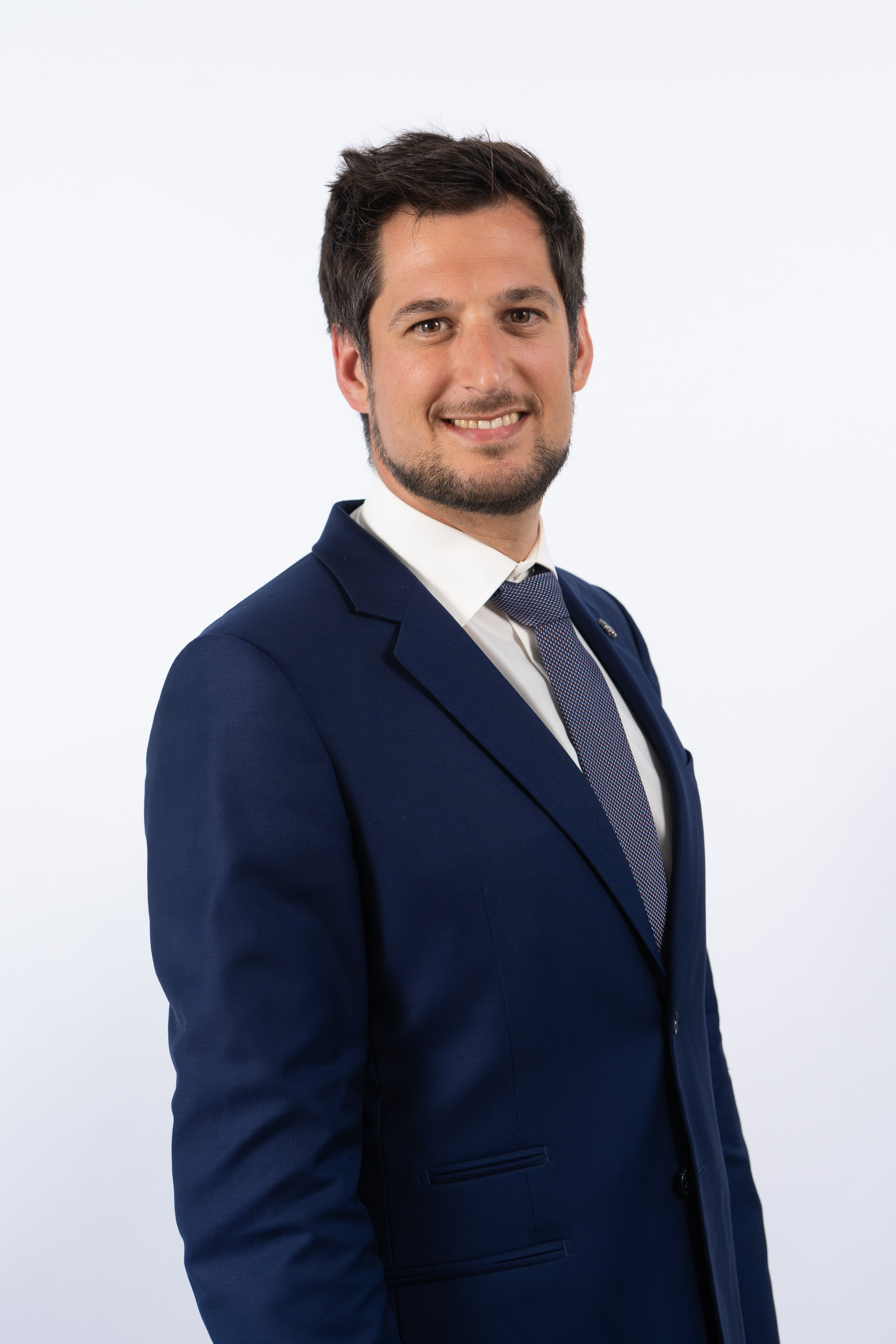
- Incumbent; Adrien Dolimont since 15 July 2024
- Residence: Élysette
- Seat: Rue Mazy, 25-27; BE-5000 Namur
- Term length: Five years
- Inaugural holder: Jean-Maurice Dehousse
- Formation: 22 December 1981
- Website: http://gouvernement.wallonie.be

The minister-president of Wallonia (French: Ministre-président de Wallonie) is the head of the Government of Wallonia, the executive power of Wallonia, one of the three regions of Belgium.

The official residence, known as the Élysette, is in Namur, along the Meuse River.

The minister-president should not be confused with the minister-president of the French Community of Belgium, which is currently led by Élisabeth Degryse.

== List of officeholders ==
No.	Portrait	Name (Birth–Death)	Election	Term of office			Political party	Government	
No.	Portrait	Name (Birth–Death)	Election	Took office	Left office	Time in office	Political party	Name	Composition
1		Jean-Maurice Dehousse (1936–2023)	1981	22 December 1981	26 January 1982	35 days	Socialist Party (PS)	Dehousse I	PS–PRL–PSC
2		André Damseaux (1937–2007)	—	26 January 1982	25 October 1982	272 days	Liberal Reformist Party (PRL)	Damseaux	PRL–PS–PSC
3		Jean-Maurice Dehousse (1936–2023)	—	25 October 1982	11 December 1985	3 years, 46 days	Socialist Party (PS)	Dehousse II	PS–PRL–PSC
4		Melchior Wathelet (1949–)	1985	11 December 1985	3 February 1988	2 years, 53 days	Christian-Social Party (PSC)	Wathelet	PSC–PRL
5		Guy Coëme (1946–)	1987	3 February 1988	9 May 1988	96 days	Socialist Party (PS)	Coëme	PS–PSC
6		Bernard Anselme (1945–)	—	11 May 1988	7 January 1992	3 years, 240 days	Socialist Party (PS)	Anselme	PS–PSC
7		Guy Spitaels (1931–2012)	1991	7 January 1992	25 January 1994	2 years, 18 days	Socialist Party (PS)	Spitaels	PS–PSC
8		Robert Collignon (1943–)	—	25 January 1994	15 July 1999	5 years, 172 days	Socialist Party (PS)	Collignon I	PS–PSC
8		Robert Collignon (1943–)	1995	25 January 1994	15 July 1999	5 years, 172 days	Socialist Party (PS)	Collignon II	PS–PSC
9		Elio Di Rupo (1951–)	1999	15 July 1999	4 April 2000	264 days	Socialist Party (PS)	Di Rupo I	PS–PRL-FDF–Ecolo
10		Jean-Claude Van Cauwenberghe (1944–)	—	4 April 2000	30 September 2005	5 years, 178 days	Socialist Party (PS)	Van Cauwenberghe I	PS–PRL-FDF–Ecolo
10		Jean-Claude Van Cauwenberghe (1944–)	2004	4 April 2000	30 September 2005	5 years, 178 days	Socialist Party (PS)	Van Cauwenberghe II	PS–cdH
—		André Antoine (acting) (1951–)	—	30 September 2005	6 October 2005	6 days	Humanist Democratic Center (cdH)	Antoine	cdH–PS
11		Elio Di Rupo (1951–)	—	6 October 2005	20 July 2007	1 year, 287 days	Socialist Party (PS)	Di Rupo II	PS–cdH
12		Rudy Demotte (1963–)	—	20 July 2007	22 July 2014	7 years, 2 days	Socialist Party (PS)	Demotte I	PS–cdH
12		Rudy Demotte (1963–)	2009	20 July 2007	22 July 2014	7 years, 2 days	Socialist Party (PS)	Demotte II	PS–Ecolo–cdH
13		Paul Magnette (1971–)	2014	22 July 2014	28 July 2017	3 years, 6 days	Socialist Party (PS)	Magnette	PS–cdH
14		Willy Borsus (1962–)	—	28 July 2017	13 September 2019	2 years, 46 days	Reformist Movement (MR)	Borsus	MR–cdH
15		Elio Di Rupo (1951–)	2019	13 September 2019	15 July 2024	4 years, 306 days	Socialist Party (PS)	Di Rupo III	PS–MR–Ecolo
16		Adrien Dolimont (1988–)	2024	15 July 2024	Incumbent	2 years, 55 days	Reformist Movement (MR)	Dolimont	MR–LE

== See also ==
- Prime Minister of Belgium
- Minister-President of the Brussels-Capital Region
- Minister-President of Flanders
- Minister-President of the French Community
- Minister-President of the German-speaking Community
