= Melchior Wathelet =

Belgian politician (born 1949)

Minister-President of Wallonia
- In office 11 December 1985 – 3 February 1988
- Preceded by: Jean-Maurice Dehousse
- Succeeded by: Guy Coëme

Personal details
- Born: 6 March 1949 (age 77) Petit-Rechain
- Party: Humanist Democratic Centre
- Education: University of Liège; Harvard University

Melchior H. M. J. F. C. Wathelet (born 6 March 1949) is a Belgian politician and member of the Humanist Democratic Centre who served as 4th Minister-President of Wallonia. He has degrees in law and in economics (University of Liège) and is a Master of Laws (Harvard University). He is also a professor at the Catholic University of Louvain and the Université de Liège. From 1995 to 2003 he was a Judge at the European Court of Justice. Following that, Wathelet served as Secretary of State for Asylum and Migration. In 2012-2018, Wathelet served as Advocate-General at the Court of Justice.

== Political career ==
- Member of the Chamber of Representatives (1977–1995)
- Secretary of State for Regional Economy of the Walloon Region (1980–1981)
- Minister of New Technologies and SMEs of the Walloon Region (1981–1985)
- Minister-President of the Walloon Region (1985–1988)
- Deputy Prime Minister and Minister of Justice and Middle Classes (1988–1992)
- Deputy Prime Minister and Minister of Justice and Economic Affairs (1992–1995)
- Deputy Prime Minister and Minister of Defence (1995)
- Mayor of Verviers (1995)

== Controversy ==
As Justice Minister he had, according to David Canter, "encouraged the early release of many sex offenders" which included Marc Dutroux, a convicted child molester and subsequent serial killer. This particular release resulted in the European Parliament calling for his resignation as an ECJ judge in 1997. The European Parliament does not have the right to appoint ECJ judges, and it was the first time that it attempted to influence their selection.

== See also ==
- List of members of the European Court of Justice

Political offices
Preceded by Jean-Maurice Dehousse	Minister-President of Walloonia; 1985–1988	Succeeded by Guy Coëme
