= Socialist Party (Belgium) =

Socialist Party: Parti socialiste (French); Socialistische Partij (Dutch); Sozialistische Partei (German)
- Abbreviation: PS
- President: Paul Magnette
- Founded: 1978; 48 years ago
- Preceded by: Belgian Socialist Party
- Headquarters: National Secretariat; Bd de l'Empereur/Keizerslaan 13, Brussels
- Think tank: Institut Émile Vandervelde
- Youth wing: Movement of Young Socialists
- Membership (2021): 32,000
- Ideology: Social democracy
- Political position: Centre-left to left-wing
- Regional affiliation: Socialists, Greens and Democrats
- European affiliation: Party of European Socialists
- European Parliament group: Progressive Alliance of Socialists and Democrats
- International affiliation: Progressive Alliance; Socialist International
- Flemish counterpart: Vooruit
- Colours: Red
- Chamber of Representatives (French-speaking seats): 16 / 61
- Senate (French-speaking seats): 7 / 24
- Walloon Parliament: 19 / 75
- Parliament of the French Community: 28 / 94
- Brussels Parliament (French-speaking seats): 16 / 72
- European Parliament (French-speaking seats): 2 / 8
- Benelux Parliament: 3 / 21

Party flag
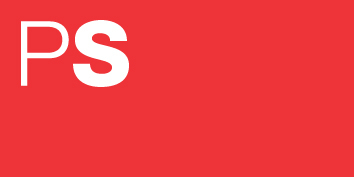

Website
- ps.be

The Socialist Party (French: Parti socialiste [paʁti sɔsjalist], PS; German: Sozialistische Partei) is a social democratic French-speaking and German-speaking political party in Belgium. As of the 2024 elections, it is the fourth largest party in the Belgian Chamber of Representatives and the second largest Francophone party. The party is led by Paul Magnette. The party supplies the minister-president of the French Community (Rudy Demotte), and the Brussels-Capital Region (Rudi Vervoort). In the German-speaking Community, the party is known as the Sozialistische Partei (SP).

The PS is very commonly part of governing coalitions, and dominates most local authorities because of the extremely fragmented nature of Belgian political institutions, particularly in Francophone areas. In the years since 1999, the PS has simultaneously controlled five regional executive bodies: the Government of the French Community, the Walloon Government, the Government of the Brussels-Capital Region, as well as the COCOF, a local subsidiary in Brussels of the French Community Government, and the Government of the German-speaking Community.

The party, or its members, have from time to time been brought into connection with criminal activities and political scandals, mostly concerning bribery and financial fraud (Cools assassination, Agusta scandal, Dassault affair, Carolorégienne affair, ICDI affair). The Carolorégienne affair caused Jean-Claude Van Cauwenberghe to step down as minister-president of Wallonia.

== Ideology ==
The PS is a social democratic political party. It is generally positioned in the centre-left or left of the political spectrum.

On its current platform, the party identifies as progressive and eco-socialist. It advocates for traditional socialist values such as equality, social justice, and (international) solidarity. It is also committed to tax reform, better and more accessible health care, expanding the social safety net, and strengthening women's rights.

=== Electoral positioning ===
During the 2019 election campaign, the RePresent research centre — composed of political scientists from five universities (UAntwerpen, KU Leuven, VUB, UCLouvain and ULB) — studied the electoral programmes of Belgium's thirteen main political parties. This study classified the parties on two "left-right" axes, from "-5" (extreme left) to "5" (extreme right): a "classic" socio-economic axis, which refers to state intervention in the economic process and the degree to which the state should ensure social equality, and a socio-cultural axis, which refers to a divide articulated around an identity-based opposition on themes such as immigration, Europe, crime, the environment, emancipation, etc.

The PS then presented the most left-wing programme, along with the PTB, on the socio-economic level (−4.43), and also left-wing on the socio-cultural level (−3.41).

The RePresent centre repeated the exercise during the 2024 election campaign for the twelve main parties. The PS's positioning shifted towards the centre, while remaining on the left, on the socio-economic axis (−3.57) and remained unchanged on the socio-cultural axis (−3.46).

== Presidents ==
Sources:

- 1978–1981: André Cools
- 1981–1992: Guy Spitaels
- 1992–1999: Philippe Busquin
- 1999–2011: Elio Di Rupo
- 2011–2013: Thierry Giet (ad interim)
- 2013–2014: Paul Magnette (ad interim)
- 2014–2019: Elio Di Rupo
- 2019–present: Paul Magnette

== Representation in EU institutions ==
In the European Parliament, the PS sits in the S&D group with two MEPs: Elio Di Rupo and Estelle Ceulemans.

== Election results ==
The PS performed well in the 2003 general election but was overtaken as the largest Francophone party by the Reformist Movement in the 2007 general election.

In the 10 June 2007 general elections, the party won 20 out of 150 seats in the Chamber of Representatives and 4 out of 40 seats in the Senate. The PS was a member of the Leterme I Government, Van Rompuy I Government, Leterme II Government and Di Rupo I Government of 6 December 2011, with former PS leader Elio Di Rupo serving as prime minister of Belgium.

=== Chamber of Representatives ===
Election	Votes	%	Seats	+/−	Government
1978	689,876	12.5	31 / 212		Coalition
1981	733,137	12.2	35 / 212	▲4	Opposition
1985	834,488	13.8	35 / 212	0	Opposition
1987	961,361	15.6	40 / 212	▲5	Coalition
1991	831,199	13.5	35 / 212	▼5	Coalition
1995	720,819	11.9	21 / 150	▼14	Coalition
1999	631,653	10.2	19 / 150	▼2	Coalition
2003	855,992	13.0	25 / 150	▲6	Coalition
2007	724,787	10.9	20 / 150	▼5	Coalition
2010	894,543	13.7	26 / 150	▲6	Coalition
2014	787,165	11.7	23 / 150	▼3	Opposition
2019	641,623	9.5	20 / 150	▼3	External support (2020)
2019	641,623	9.5	20 / 150	▼3	Coalition (2020–2025)
2024	561,602	8.0	16 / 150	▼4	Opposition

==== Timeline ====
Results for the Chamber of Representatives, in percentages for the Kingdom of Belgium.

=== Senate ===
Election	Votes	%	Seats	+/−
1978	685,307	12.5	17 / 106	
1981	755,512	12.7	18 / 106	▲1
1985	832,792	13.9	18 / 106	0
1987	958,686	15.7	20 / 106	▲2
1991	814,136	13.3	18 / 106	▼2
1995	764,610	12.8	5 / 40	▼13
1999	597,890	9.7	4 / 40	▼1
2003	840,908	12.8	6 / 40	▲2
2007	678,812	10.2	4 / 40	▼2
2010	880,828	13.6	7 / 40	▲3

=== Regional ===
==== Brussels Parliament ====
Election	Votes	%		Seats	+/−	Government
Election	Votes	F.E.C.	Overall	Seats	+/−	Government
1989	96,189		22.0 (#1)	18 / 75		Coalition
1995	88,370		21.4 (#2)	17 / 75	▼1	Coalition
1999	68,307	18.6 (#3)	16.0 (#3)	13 / 75	▼4	Coalition
2004	130,462	33.4 (#1)	28.7 (#1)	26 / 89	▲13	Coalition
2009	107,303	26.2 (#2)	23.3 (#2)	21 / 89	▼5	Coalition
2014	108,755	26.6 (#1)	23.5 (#1)	21 / 89	Steady	Coalition
2019	85,530	22.0 (#1)	18.7 (#1)	17 / 89	▼4	Coalition
2024	85,929	22.1 (#2)		16 / 89	▼1	Coalition

==== Walloon Parliament ====
Election	Votes	%	Seats	+/−	Government
1995	665,986	35.2 (#1)	30 / 75		Coalition
1999	560,867	29.4 (#1)	25 / 75	▼5	Coalition
2004	727,781	36.9 (#1)	34 / 75	▲9	Coalition
2009	657,803	32.8 (#1)	29 / 75	▼5	Coalition
2014	626,473	30.9 (#1)	30 / 75	▲1	Coalition (2014–2017)
2014	626,473	30.9 (#1)	30 / 75	▲1	Opposition (2017–2019)
2019	532,422	26.2 (#1)	23 / 75	▼7	Coalition
2024	480,003	23.2 (#2)	19 / 75	▼4	Opposition

==== German-speaking Community Parliament ====
Election	Votes	%	Seats	+/−	Government
1990	6,407	16.3	4 / 25	0	Opposition
1995	5,958	16.1	4 / 25	0	Coalition
1999	5,519	15.0	4 / 25	0	Coalition
2004	6,903	19.0	5 / 25	▲1	Coalition
2009	7,231	19.3	5 / 25	0	Coalition
2014	6,047	16.1	4 / 25	▼1	Coalition
2019	5,820	14.8	4 / 25	0	Coalition
2024	5,473	13.7	3 / 25	▼1	Opposition

=== European Parliament ===
Election	List leader	Votes		%			Seats	+/−	EP Group
Election	List leader	F.E.C.	G.E.C.	F.E.C.	G.E.C.	Overall	Seats	+/−	EP Group
1979	Anne-Marie Lizin (F.E.C.)	575,824	—N/a	27.43 (#1)	—N/a	10.58	4 / 24	New	SOC
1984	Ernest Glinne (F.E.C.)	762,293	—N/a	34.04 (#1)	—N/a	13.32	5 / 24	▲1	SOC
1989	Ernest Glinne (F.E.C.)	854,207	—N/a	38.13 (#1)	—N/a	14.48	5 / 24	0	SOC
1994	José Happart (F.E.C.); Unclear (G.E.C.)	680,142	4,820	30.44 (#1)	12.57 (#5)	11.48	3 / 25	▼2	PES
1999	Philippe Busquin (F.E.C.); Charles Servaty (G.E.C.)	596,567	4,215	25.78 (#2)	11.42 (#4)	9.59	3 / 25	0	PES
2004	Elio Di Rupo (F.E.C.); Werner Baumgarten (G.E.C.)	878,577	5,527	36.09 (#1)	14.94 (#3)	13.54	4 / 24	▲1	PES
2009	Jean-Claude Marcourt (F.E.C.); Resi Stoffels (G.E.C.)	714,947	5,658	29.10 (#1)	14.63 (#4)	10.88	3 / 22	▼1	S&D
2014	Marie Arena (F.E.C.); Antonios Antoniadis (G.E.C.)	714,645	5,835	29.29 (#1)	15.12 (#4)	10.68	3 / 21	0	S&D
2019	Paul Magnette (F.E.C.); Matthias Zimmermann (G.E.C.)	651,157	4,655	26.69 (#1)	11.42 (#4)	9.74	2 / 21	▼1	S&D
2024	Elio Di Rupo (F.E.C.); Charles Servaty (G.E.C.)	529,697	5,131	20.52 (#1)	11.82 (#5)	7.50	2 / 22	0	S&D

== Notable figures ==
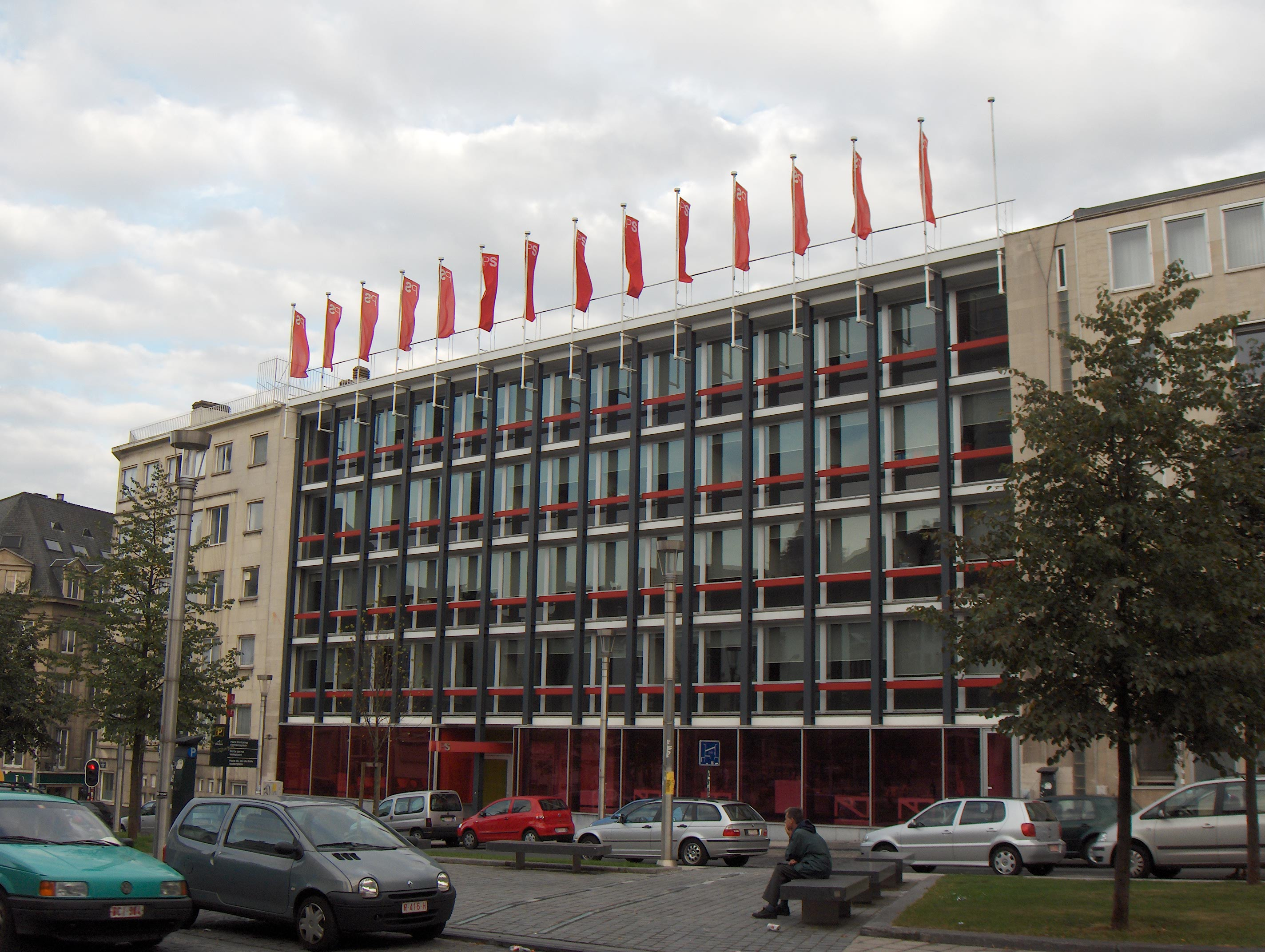
The Brussels headquarters of the PS (2006)

- André Cools
- André Flahaut
- Elio Di Rupo
- Guy Spitaels
- Jean-Claude Marcourt
- Jean-Claude Van Cauwenberghe
- Laurette Onkelinx
- Paul Magnette
- Philippe Busquin
- Philippe Moureaux
- Rudy Demotte

== See also ==
- Charter of Quaregnon
