= André Antoine (politician) =

Belgian politician (born 1960)

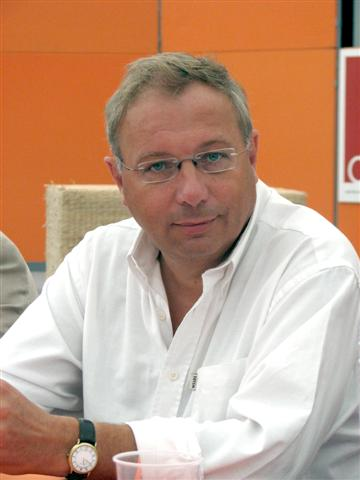
- André Antoine 2010
- Born: 3 February 1960 (age 66); Louvain, Belgium
- Education: UCLouvain
- Occupations: Politician; Mayor
- Political party: PSC / cdH

André Antoine (French pronunciation: [ɑ̃dʁe ɑ̃twan]; born 3 February 1960) is a Belgian politician, minister and mayor. He has been a member of the francophone cdH (Humanist Democratic Centre party) since 1980. He was elected to the presidency of the Wallon parliament on 22 July 2014.

== Life ==
=== Early years ===
André Antoine was born in Leuven/Louvain. He comes from a farming family. He achieved his Licentiate in Law at the University of Louvain (UCLouvain) in Louvain-la-Neuve in 1983. His degree in Higher European Studies followed a year later.

His political career began in 1980 when he joined the Christian Socialist Party (PSC, as the cdH was then called), becoming a special advisor to the party presidency. In 1983 he started to work as a cabinet assistant for the Belgian Minister for Scientific Policy and Panning, Philippe Maystadt, moving on to work as an "attaché" to the party president in 1984/85.

=== Local government ===
Antoine was a member of the municipal council in Ramillies between 1988 and 1994. Since 1994 he has been a councillor in nearby Perwez where he has also served as the mayor since 2000. From 1991 till 1994 he served as a county councillor for Brabant (later Walloon Brabant), also serving as cabinet chief to Michel Lebrun.

=== Regional government ===
In October 1985 he was selected as a PSC representative ("volksvertegenwoordiger") for the Nivelles Arrondissement, a mandate he retained till 1991. In 1995 he became a member of the newly renamed and reconfigured Parliament of Wallonia in Namur, and the Parliament of the French Community, which for most purposes is the name used for the same parliament when convening in Brussels as part of the national legislative structure.

Re-elected to the Wallon parliament in 1999, he became the leader of the PSC group in it. In 2003 Joëlle Milquet appointed Antoine a vice-president of the recently renamed cdH (party), hitherto the PSC.

The next year, 2004, he attained ministerial office, becoming the regional Minister for Housing, Transport and Regeneration. His wide palette of responsibilities included general and school transport, energy policy, housing and land use, zoning, airports and railway investment. In 2009 he became regional Minister for the Budget, Finance, Employment, Training and Sport. Despite the change of post, he retained responsibility for airports policy in Wallonia, which under an EU directive from 2002 gives him the power to place a ban on night takes-offs and landings. However, it is not a power he exercised: there are very few nighttime take-offs and landings in Wallonia.

Re-elected to the assembly again in 2014, he became president of the Wallon parliament on 22 July 2014.
