= List of candidates in the 2004 European Parliament election in Belgium =

This is a list of all the candidates in the Belgian European Parliament election, held in 2004.

== European Parliament ==
=== Electoral colleges ===
==== Dutch-speaking (14 seats) ====
Major parties:

	CD&V + N-VA	1,131,119 (28.15%)	4 (—)	Jean-Luc Dehaene
	Candidate	Votes		
1.	Jean-Luc Dehaene [1]	651,345		
2.	Marianne Thyssen [2]	116,418		
3.	Ivo Belet [3]	142,554		
4.	Jacques Van Outryve	57,437		
5.	Marie De Clerck	97,606		
6.	Hilde Van De Werf	37,134		
7.	Jeroen Vanden Berghe	23,931		
8.	Jan De Keyser	31,972		
9.	Petra Geukens	39,433		
10.	Flor Van Noppen	52,032		
11.	Karolien Weekers	27,977		
12.	Diane Vossius	26,983		
13.	Elke Tindemans	64,258		
14.	Geert Bourgeois [4]	133,430		
(1)	Frieda Brepoels	99,464		
(2)	Bart Dochy	35,729		
(3)	Wilfried Vandaele	23,946		
(4)	Trees Van Eykeren	23,992		
(5)	Brecht Tessier	15,428		
(6)	Melkan Kucam	13,174		
(7)	Simone Van Brussel-Ketels	17,269		
(8)	Riet Van Cleuvenbergen	33,797		

	GROEN!	320,874 (7.99%)	1 (–1)	Bart Staes
	Candidate	Votes		
1.	Bart Staes [1]	79,508		
2.	Tinne Van der Straeten	33,230		
3.	Meryem Kaçar	24,067		
4.	Helder Swartele	6,935		
5.	Hugo Van Dienderen	8,459		
6.	Veerle Declercq	16,487		
7.	Relinde Baeten	11,555		
8.	Tom Jones	7,638		
9.	Joke Van De Putte	14,439		
10.	Jan-Jan Sabbe	6,002		
11.	Eddy Boutmans	11,734		
12.	Mieke Vogels	39,485		
13.	Jos Geysels	24,025		
14.	Vera Dua	55,827		
(1)	Isabel Vertriest	14,665		
(2)	Leen Laenens	10,376		
(3)	Rik Jellema	4,212		
(4)	Philippe Avijn	4,221		
(5)	Marianne Vergeyle	8,470		
(6)	Jan Allein	3,744		
(7)	Jef Ulburghs	7,680		
(8)	Magda Aelvoet	20,917		

	VLD + VIVANT	880,279 (21.91%)	3 (—)	Guy Verhofstadt
	Candidate	Votes		
1.	Guy Verhofstadt [1]	388,011		
2.	Karel De Gucht [2]	159,332		
3.	Annemie Neyts [3]	104,218		
4.	Roland Duchatelet	56,899		
5.	Dewi Van De Vyver	24,185		
6.	Geert Messiaen	20,764		
7.	Sofie Staelraeve	25,945		
8.	Hilde Vautmans	30,836		
9.	Luc Beaucourt	33,259		
10.	Kathleen Van Der Hooft	24,493		
11.	Margriet Hermans	48,618		
12.	Bart Tommelein	24,956		
13.	Fientje Moerman	55,087		
14.	Patrick Dewael	99,410		
(1)	Dirk Sterckx	180,774		
(2)	Johan Van Hecke	34,190		
(3)	Gwendolyn Rutten	19,708		
(4)	Marilena Di Stasi	16,206		
(5)	Annemie Van De Casteele	26,733		
(6)	Jeannine Leduc	27,772		
(7)	Marc Verwilghen	65,959		
(8)	Rik Daems	44,289		

	SP.A + SPIRIT	716,317 (17.83%)	3 (—)	Mia De Vits
	Candidate	Votes		
1.	Mia De Vits [1]	202,082		
2.	Anne Van Lancker [2]	60,483		
3.	Saïd El Khadraoui [3]	60,712		
4.	Ludwig Vandenhove	29,082		
5.	Jan Dhaene	23,845		
6.	Nelly Maes	43,251		
7.	Peter Corens	15,794		
8.	Fatma Pehlivan	42,177		
9.	Claudia Pasqualoni	20,445		
10.	Johan Van Hove	14,306		
11.	Karin Heremans	19,468		
12.	Stijn Bex	16,644		
13.	Sarah Willockx	37,198		
14.	Bert Anciaux	101,357		
(1)	Fauzaya Talhaoui	46,618		
(2)	Jurgen Vanlerberghe	15,453		
(3)	Stefaan Thijs	15,024		
(4)	Sylvain Sleypen	13,709		
(5)	Nadia Staes	17,954		
(6)	Anita Ceulemans	15,419		
(7)	Anne-Marie Baeke	16,043		
(8)	Louis Tobback	72,194		

	VLAAMS BLOK	930,731 (23.16%)	3 (+1)	Frank Vanhecke
	Candidate	Votes		
1.	Frank Vanhecke [1]	260,430		
2.	Philip Claeys [2]	43,036		
3.	Marie-Rose Morel	73,010		
4.	Hilde De Lobel	36,923		
5.	Francis Van Den Eynde	35,408		
6.	Guy D'Haeseleer	29,791		
7.	Godelieve Van Den Berghe	31,922		
8.	Suzanne Lacombe-Verbeest	26,770		
9.	Annemie Peeters-Muyshondt	28,655		
10.	Marleen Beckers-Govaerts	30,825		
11.	Jurgen Verstrepen	57,063		
12.	Johan Demol	51,896		
13.	Anke Van Dermeersch	75,195		
14.	Filip Dewinter [3]	193,525		
(1)	Koen Dillen	55,550		
(2)	Luk Van Nieuwenhuysen	22,805		
(3)	Alexandra Colen	34,144		
(4)	Frieda Van Themsche	22,669		
(5)	Nadia Van Beughem	19,715		
(6)	Goedele De Man-Van Haelst	19,562		
(7)	Jef Van Bree	19,257		
(8)	Gerolf Annemans	68,149		

Minor parties:

	LSP	14,166 (0.35%)	0 (=0)	Anja Deschoemacker
	Candidate	Votes		
1.	Anja Deschoemacker	1,892		
2.	Geert Cool	605		
3.	Nicole Vanderputte	663		
4.	Jon Sneyers	491		
5.	Dagmar Walgraeve	443		
6.	Amaury Vanhooren	431		
7.	Stephanie Deberdt	518		
8.	Frank Hoste	450		
9.	Marie-Rose Balbaert	466		
10.	David Van Gorp	369		
11.	Hannelore Lammens	541		
12.	Paul Piessens	400		
13.	Katrijn Zaman	705		
14.	Eric Byl	726		
(1)	François Bliki	802		
(2)	Tina Degreef	554		
(3)	Micha Teller	441		
(4)	Elisa Jansen	476		
(5)	Jef Maes	407		
(6)	Liesbeth Dellafaille	497		
(7)	Peter Delsing	413		
(8)	Els Deschoemacker	1,813		

	PVDA+	24,807 (0.62%)	0 (=0)	Kris Merckx
	Candidate	Votes		
1.	Kris Merckx	5,731		
2.	Zohra Othman	2,206		
3.	Dirk Goemaere	1,290		
4.	Riet Vandeputte	1,208		
5.	Raf Jespers	927		
6.	Belgin Özgünes	1,539		
7.	Roger Putzeys	734		
8.	Rita Vanobberghen	1,016		
9.	Peter Degand	753		
10.	Lies Horrie	940		
11.	Dirk Van Duppen	1,073		
12.	An Lenaerts	1,096		
13.	Lise Vandecasteele	1,137		
14.	Harrie Dewitte	1,932		
(1)	Peter Mertens	1,689		
(2)	Riet Dhont	830		
(3)	Staf Henderickx	960		
(4)	Sonja Welvaert	896		
(5)	Peter Franssen	695		
(6)	Lieveke Norga	839		
(7)	Karima Riahi	1,094		
(8)	Jan Vandeputte	1,320		

==== French-speaking (9 seats) ====
Major parties:

	CDH	368,753 (15.15%)	1 (=0)	Joëlle Milquet
	Candidate	Votes		
1.	Joëlle Milquet [1]	191,900		
2.	Marcel Crochet	38,573		
3.	Catherine Doyen-Fonck	19,300		
4.	Vanessa Matz	17,564		
5.	Fabienne Manandise	20,784		
6.	Hamza Fassi-Fihri	13,332		
7.	Marie-Paule Leboutte-Detelle	16,938		
8.	Benoît Lutgen	31,942		
9.	Jean-Jacques Viseur	30,057		
1.	Raymond Langendries	50,871		
2.	Claire Vandevivere	14,834		
3.	Antoine Tanzilli	8,223		
4.	Ekaterini Sigalas-Stamati	6,797		
5.	Marc-Antoine Mathijsen	8.,944		
6.	Clotilde Traversa-Nyssens	18,784		

	ECOLO	239,687 (9.84%)	1 (–2)	Pierre Jonckheer
	Candidate	Votes		
1.	Pierre Jonckheer [1]	23,236		
2.	Isabelle Durant	73,597		
3.	José Daras	25,121		
4.	Nermin Kumanova	7,889		
5.	Jacopo Moccia	4,795		
6.	Béatrice Clementz	11,141		
7.	Josy Dubié	23,258		
8.	Samia Mahgoub	11,753		
9.	Bob Kabamba	13,526		
1.	Thérèse Snoy et d'Oppuers	11,212		
2.	Marc Hordies	5,877		
3.	Juliette Boulet	11,376		
4.	Ahmed Amani	6,606		
5.	Murielle Frenay	9,293		
6.	Marc Abramowicz	8,486		

	MR	671,422 (27.58%)	3 (=0)	Louis Michel
	Candidate	Votes		
1.	Louis Michel [1]	327,374		

	PS	878,577 (36.09%)	4 (+1)	Elio Di Rupo
	Candidate	Votes		
1.	Elio Di Rupo [1]	483,644		

==== German-speaking (1 seat) ====
Major parties:

	CSP	15,722 (42.49%)	1 (=0)	Mathieu Grosch
	Candidate	Votes		
1.	Mathieu Grosch [1]	9,211		
