= Meyrem Almaci =

Belgian politician

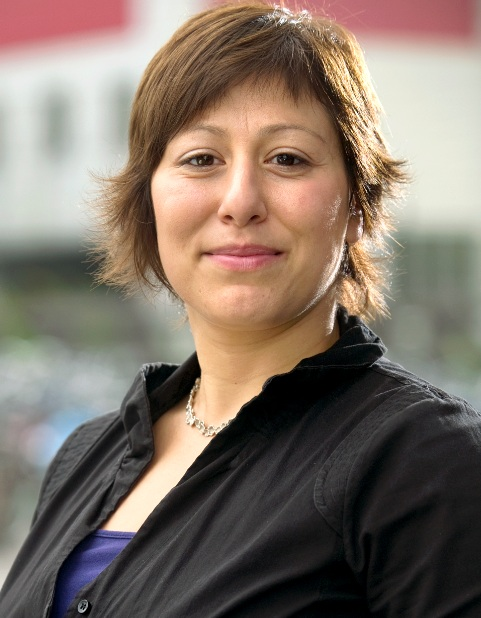

Member of the Flemish Parliament
- Incumbent
- Assumed office 26 May 2019

Party President of Groen
- In office 15 November 2014 – 11 June 2022
- Preceded by: Wouter Van Besien
- Succeeded by: Jeremie Vaneeckhout and Nadia Naji as party co-presidents

Member of the Chamber of Representatives
- In office 10 June 2007 – 12 June 2010
- In office 13 June 2010 – 24 May 2014
- In office 25 May 2014 – 25 May 2019

Personal details
- Born: 25 February 1976 (age 50) Sint-Niklaas, Belgium
- Party: Groen
- Occupation: Politician
- Website: Official website

Meyrem Almaci (Sint-Niklaas, 25 February 1976) is a Belgian politician from Flanders and member of the ecological party Groen.

On 10 June 2007, she was elected to the Belgian Chamber of Representatives for the first time. She was re-elected in 2010 and in 2014 when she also became the president of Groen. In 2019 she left the Belgian parliament and was elected in the Flemish Parliament.

== Biography ==
Almaci was born to a Turkish immigrant family hailing from Kozluçay in Yalvaç, Isparta Province. She had 10 siblings, two of whom died young. She has Turkish-Belgian dual citizenship and is married with two children.

Almaci obtained a master's degree in comparative cultural studies at the University of Ghent and a bachelor's degree in Social Work, option Socio-cultural work. From 2002 to 2007, she worked as a scientific assistant on research projects on study choice and study success of immigrants in higher education at the Vrije Universiteit Brussel and the KU Leuven.

== Political career ==
=== Start in politics ===
Almaci came to Groen because of the environmental theme. She was a member of the World Wildlife Fund and Greenpeace and was concerned about the lack of a sustainable economy. In 2000 she founded a branch of Agalev, the predecessor of Groen, in her then hometown of Sint-Gillis-Waas and became a councilor from 2001 to 2006. In 2006 she moved to Berchem, where she became a district councilor for a while in 2007. Because of her move to Deurne she had to leave the Berchem district council. For Jong Groen she was spokesperson from 2005 to 2006, and chairperson from 2006 to 2007.

=== In Federal Parliament (2007 - 2019) ===
In 2007 the party chose Almaci to become the leader of the Antwerp constituency for the 2007 Belgian federal election. Almaci was elected to the Belgian House of Representatives with 14,628 preferential votes. Almaci was appointed co-chair of the joint green caucus formed out of members of the Dutch-speaking party Groen and the francophone party Ecolo. Almaci shared this responsibility with the Ecolo-politicians Jean-Marc Nollet, Muriel Gerkens and Olivier Deleuze.

Following the 2010 Belgian federal election she took the oath of office for the second time as a member of the Chamber of Representatives for the Ecolo-Groen faction. With 25,100 preferential votes she also helped Kristof Calvo get elected to a second seat for Groen in the Antwerp constituency. Later that year, she was elected party leader. She passed the caucus chairmanship in 2012 to fellow MP Stefaan Van Hecke.

In the 2014 Belgian federal election, she received 44,150 preferential votes as party leader in the elections, which allowed her to extend her mandate in the House.

==== Specializations ====
In addition to the annual budget control, Almaci mainly specialized in financial files and the government budget. She mainly drew attention during the 2008 financial crisis and in particular in the so-called Dexia Special Committee. Almaci repeatedly asked for this 'Special Committee' to be turned into a committee with investigative powers to be able to demand the lead actors and have them testify under oath. The MPs of the ruling parties refused to do so.

In the Chamber, Almaci was among others:

- permanent member of the Subcommittee "Court of Auditors" of the Committee on Finance and the Budget;
- permanent member of the special committee in charge of investigating the 2008 financial crisis;
- deputy of the special committee charged with investigating the circumstances which led to the dismantling of Dexia SA;
- deputy in the Committee on Finance and Budget;
- deputy in the Advisory Committee on Social Emancipation;
- deputy in the Committee on Business, Science Policy, Education, National Scientific and Cultural Institutions, the Self-Employed and Agriculture;
- deputy in the Commission in charge of the Problems of Commercial and Economic Law;
- deputy in the Control Commission on Election Expenditure and Accounting of Political Parties;
- deputy in the Advisory Committee on Scientific and Technological Questions.

=== Municipal politics Antwerp ===
In the 2012 Belgian local elections Almaci was the main candidate in Antwerp. She was elected with 8037 preferential votes. Before the new legislature, she was appointed as group leader for her party in the municipal council. Due to her election as party chairwoman, she resigned from the city council in 2015. In the 2018 local elections, she supported the Antwerp Green list from the last spot on the list. Despite being just a supporting candidate, Almaci was nevertheless elected as a councilor with 8,414 preferential votes, but decided not to take her seat.

=== In Flemish Parliament ===
In the 2019 elections, she did not represent herself again for the Belgian federal parliament, but instead presented herself for the Flemish Parliament in the same Antwerp Constituency. She was elected with 50,848 preference votes.

=== Party chairwoman ===
On September 21, 2014, Almaci applied to become party chairwoman of Groen. She took on Jeremie Vaneeckhout as a running mate. She competed against Elke Van den Brandt, running with Wouter De Vriendt. On November 15, 2014, Almaci was elected president with 60% of the vote.

In September 2019, it was announced that Almaci was running for a second term as party chairwoman, this time with Dany Neudt as candidate vice chair. She was re-elected with 53.2 percent of the vote.

In March 2022, she announced her early retirement as chair. She said she wanted to spend more time with her family and for internal renewal, although since the start of her second term she has been increasingly confronted with internal criticism about the way she led the party. For example, there was some dissatisfaction about the fact that then caucus leader Kristof Calvo was passed over as minister when the new Belgian federal government was formed in October 2020. Pending the election of a new chairman, Almaci remained on as acting chairman. In June 2022 the members of Groen elected two new people as party presidents: Jeremie Vaneeckhout and Nadia Naji.

Almaci continued to exercise her office as a Flemish Member of Parliament.

=== Back to Federal Parliament ===
In the 2024 elections, Almaci was the main candidate for the federal parliament in the province of Antwerp. She got elected with 23 876 preferential votes. She became vice-chair in the commission Economy, Consumer Protection and Digitalisation.

== See also ==
- Groen (political party)
