= Brussels (Flemish Parliament constituency) =

Parliamentary Constituency of Belgium

- Flemish Parliament constituency
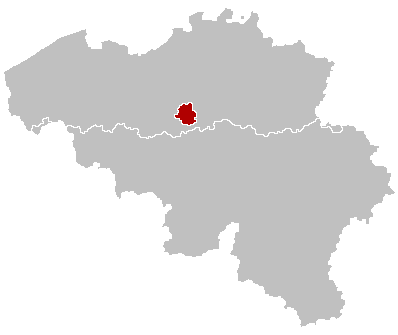
- Brussels within Belgium

Current constituency
- Created: 2004
- Seats: 6

Brussels is a parliamentary constituency in Belgium used to elect members of the Flemish Parliament since 2004. It corresponds to the Brussels Capital Region.

The election coincides with the one for the (bilingual) Brussels Parliament; voters who vote for a Dutch-language list for the Brussels Parliament can subsequently vote for members of the Flemish Parliament. This direct election was introduced in 2001; previously the members were appointed by the Dutch-speaking elected members of the Brussels Parliament.

The members elected in this district may only vote on matters for the Flemish Community, not on matters for the Flemish Region.

== Representatives ==
| Election | MFP (Party) | MFP (Party) | MFP (Party) | MFP (Party) | MFP (Party) | MFP (Party) |
|---|---|---|---|---|---|---|
| 1995 (appointed) | Anne Van Asbroeck (SP) | Dominiek Lootens-Stael (VB) | Jan Béghin (CVP) | Leo Goovaerts (Open Vld) | Roeland Van Walleghem (VB) | Walter Vandenbossche (CVP) |
| 1999 (appointed) | Yamila Idrissi (SP) | Dominiek Lootens-Stael (VB) | Brigitte Grouwels (CVP) | Sven Gatz (VU) | Johan Demol (VB) | Walter Vandenbossche (CVP) |
| 2004 | Elke Roex (SP.A) | Erik Arckens (VB) | Greet Van Linter (VB) | Sven Gatz (VU) | Monique Moens (VB) | Paul Delva (CD&V) |
| 2009 | Yamila Idrissi (SP.A) | Erik Arckens (VB) | Ann Brusseel (Open Vld) | Khadija Zamouri (Open Vld) | Luckas Vander Taelen (Groen) | Paul Delva (CD&V) |
| 2014 | Yamila Idrissi (SP.A) | Karl Vanlouwe (N-VA) | Franc Bogovic (Open Vld) | Lionel Bajart (Open Vld) | Elke Van den Brandt (Groen) | Joris Poschet (CD&V) |
| 2019 | Hannelore Goeman (SP.A/ Vooruit) | Karl Vanlouwe (N-VA) | Els Ampe (Open Vld) | Stijn Bex (Groen) | Celia Groothedde (Groen) | Annabel Tavernier (N-VA) |
| 2024 | Hannelore Goeman (SP.A/ Vooruit) | Karl Vanlouwe (N-VA) | Dominiek Lootens-Stael (Vlaams Belang) | Nadia Naji (Groen) | Bram Jaques (Groen) | M'Hamed Kasmi (Team Fouad Ahidar) |
