= List of members of the Senate of Belgium, 1991–1995 =

This is the list of Belgian Senators from 1991 till 1995.

== Election results (24 November 1991) ==
Party	Votes	%	Seats	+/–
Christian People Party	1,028,699	16.82	20	–2
Parti Socialiste	814,136	13.31	18	+2
Socialistische Partij	730,274	11.94	14	–3
Party for Freedom and Progress	713,542	11.66	13	+2
Liberal Reformist Party	496,562	8.12	9	–3
Christian Social Party	483,961	7.91	9	0
Vlaams Blok	414,481	6.78	5	+4
People's Union	365,173	5.97	5	–3
Ecolo	323,683	5.29	6	+4
Agalev	314,360	5.14	5	+2
ROSSEM	197,128	3.22	1	New
Democratic Front of the Francophones–Party for Wallonia	86,026	1.41	1	0
National Front	60,876	1.00	0	New
Workers' Party of Belgium	31,754	0.52	0	0
Belgium–Europe–Belgium	15,893	0.26	0	New
Rainbow	12,150	0.20	0	New
Communist Party	6,552	0.11	0	New
Socialist Workers' Party	6,485	0.11	0	0
VD	4,228	0.07	0	New
Walloon Rally	3,441	0.06	0	0
Party of New Forces–PCN	2,777	0.05	0	0
Democratic Union for the Respect of Labour	2,209	0.04	0	0
UCD	1,387	0.02	0	New
FNBB	1,197	0.02	0	New
NV	640	0.01	0	New
Total	6,117,614	100.00	106	0
Valid votes	6,117,614	92.34		
Invalid/blank votes	507,361	7.66		
Total votes	6,624,975	100.00		
Registered voters/turnout	7,144,888	92.72		
Source: Belgian Elections

=== Directly elected senators ===
==== Antwerp ====
Senator	Party
Frank Swaelen	CVP
Herman Suykerbuyk	CVP
Leona Detiege	SP
Marcel Bartholomeeussen	SP
Ludo Dierickx	Agalev
Hugo Schiltz	People's Union
Jacky Buchmann	PVV
Wim Verreycken	Vlaams Blok
Walter Peeters	Vlaams Blok
Willy Goossens	ROSSEM

==== Brabant ====
Senator	Party
Pierre Jonckheer	Ecolo

==== Bruges ====
Senator	Party
Johan Weyts	CVP

==== Hasselt-Tongeren-Maaseik ====
Senator	Party
Jeannine Leduc	PVV

==== Liege ====
Senator	Party
Michel Foret	PRL
Philippe Monfils	PRL
Henri Mouton	PS

==== Luxembourg ====
Senator	Party
Jean Bock	PRL

==== Malines-Turnhout ====
Senator	Party
Lydia Maximus	SP

==== Namur ====
Senator	Party
Christine Cornet d'Elzius	PRL

=== Coopted senators ===
==== Dutch language group (16) ====
Senator	Party
Leo Delcroix	CVP
Fred Erdman	SP
Leo Goovaerts	PVV
Hugo Vandenberghe	CVP
Herman Van Thillo	PVV
Lisette Croes	SP
Paul Pataer	SP
Paul De Grauwe	PVV
Maxime Stroobant	SP
Willy Kuijpers	People's Union
Frans Lozie	Agalev
Jan Van Erps	CVP
Lambert Kelchtermans	CVP
Leo Delcroix	CVP
Mark Vanmoerkerke	CVP
Erik Matthijs	CVP

==== French language group (11) ====
Senator	Party
Jean-Marie Happart	PS
Robert Hotyat	PS
Jean-Paul Vancrombruggen	SP
Alfred Evers	PRL
Jacqueline Herzet	PRL
Alberto Borin	PS
Denis D'Hondt	PRL
Paul-Joseph Benker	Ecolo
Claude Bougard	Ecolo
Andrée Delcourt-Pêtre	PSC
Pierre Scharff	PSC
