= 1999 Belgian federal election =

| ← 1995 | 13 June 1999 | 2003 → |
- Chamber of Representatives
- All 150 seats in the Chamber of Representatives; 76 seats needed for a majority
- Turnout: 90.56%
| Party | Leader | Vote % | Seats | +/– |
|---|---|---|---|---|
| VLD | Guy Verhofstadt | 14.30 | 23 | +2 |
| CVP | Jean-Luc Dehaene | 14.09 | 22 | −7 |
| Socialiste | Elio Di Rupo | 10.16 | 19 | −2 |
| PRL–FDF | Louis Michel | 10.14 | 18 | 0 |
| Vlaams Blok | Frank Vanhecke | 9.87 | 15 | +4 |
| Socialistische | Fred Erdman | 9.55 | 14 | −6 |
| Ecolo | | 7.36 | 11 | +5 |
| Agalev | Jos Geysels | 6.99 | 9 | +4 |
| PSC | Philippe Maystadt | 5.88 | 10 | −2 |
| People's Union | Patrik Vankrunkelsven | 5.56 | 8 | +3 |
| National Front | Daniel Féret | 1.45 | 1 | −1 |
This lists parties that won seats. See the complete results below.
- Senate
- 40 of the 71 seats in the Senate; 36 seats needed for a majority
- Turnout: 90.57%
| Party | Vote % | Seats |
|---|---|---|
| VLD | 15.37 | 11 |
| CVP | 14.75 | 10 |
| PRL–FDF | 10.57 | 9 |
| Socialiste | 9.65 | 10 |
| Vlaams Blok | 9.42 | 6 |
| Socialistische | 8.89 | 6 |
| Ecolo | 7.4 | 6 |
| Agalev | 7.09 | 5 |
| PSC | 6.04 | 5 |
| People's Union | 5.13 | 3 |
This lists parties that won seats. See the complete results below.

| Government before | Government after election |
|---|---|
| Dehaene II; CVP-PSC-PS-SP | Verhofstadt I VLD-PRL-PS-SP-Agalev-Ecolo |

Federal elections were held in Belgium on June 13, 1999 to elect members of the Chamber of Representatives and Senate. The elections were held on the same day as the European elections and the regional elections. The Flemish Liberals and Democrats (VLD) became the largest party.

The Christian Democrats (CVP/PSC) suffered historic losses due to the dioxine affair that broke loose that year. Jean-Luc Dehaene's reign of eight years came to an end. Verhofstadt formed a six-party coalition comprising the liberal (VLD and PRL), socialist (SP and PS), and green parties (Agalev and Ecolo). It was the first liberal-led government since 1938, and the first since 1958 that didn't include a Christian Democratic party.

== Results ==
=== Chamber of Representatives ===
| Party | Votes | % | Seats | +/– |
|---|---|---|---|---|
| Flemish Liberals and Democrats | 888,861 | 14.30 | 23 | +2 |
| Christian People's Party | 875,455 | 14.09 | 22 | –7 |
| Parti Socialiste | 631,653 | 10.16 | 19 | –2 |
| Liberal Reformist Party–Democratic Front of Francophones | 630,219 | 10.14 | 18 | 0 |
| Vlaams Blok | 613,399 | 9.87 | 15 | +4 |
| Socialistische Partij | 593,372 | 9.55 | 14 | –6 |
| Ecolo | 457,281 | 7.36 | 11 | +5 |
| Agalev | 434,449 | 6.99 | 9 | +4 |
| Christian Social Party | 365,318 | 5.88 | 10 | –2 |
| People's Union | 345,576 | 5.56 | 8 | +3 |
| Vivant | 130,701 | 2.10 | 0 | New |
| National Front | 90,401 | 1.45 | 1 | –1 |
| Workers' Party of Belgium | 25,215 | 0.41 | 0 | 0 |
| Communist Party | 23,081 | 0.37 | 0 | 0 |
| Party for a New Politics in Belgium | 22,591 | 0.36 | 0 | New |
| New Belgian Front | 22,491 | 0.36 | 0 | New |
| WALLON | 11,863 | 0.19 | 0 | 0 |
| Aging with Dignity (Flanders) | 8,033 | 0.13 | 0 | 0 |
| FRANCE | 7,493 | 0.12 | 0 | New |
| Alliance | 4,001 | 0.06 | 0 | New |
| PJU–PDB | 2,945 | 0.05 | 0 | 0 |
| Social-Liberal Democrats | 2,623 | 0.04 | 0 | New |
| Social Democrat Party | 1,928 | 0.03 | 0 | New |
| LEEF | 1,703 | 0.03 | 0 | New |
| Employment is Investing in the Future | 1,610 | 0.03 | 0 | 0 |
| Alliance for Truth and Law in Belgium | 1,597 | 0.03 | 0 | New |
| Belgian Indian with No Name | 1,488 | 0.02 | 0 | New |
| Noor | 1,244 | 0.02 | 0 | New |
| Democratic Union | 1,119 | 0.02 | 0 | New |
| For a Movement in Defence of Workers and Youth | 1,068 | 0.02 | 0 | New |
| NP | 943 | 0.02 | 0 | New |
| National Front – Walloon Federation | 859 | 0.01 | 0 | New |
| Front of the Belgian Nation–Party | 671 | 0.01 | 0 | New |
| People's Nationalist Party | 656 | 0.01 | 0 | 0 |
| Stardust | 649 | 0.01 | 0 | New |
| VIC | 636 | 0.01 | 0 | New |
| Democratic Right | 607 | 0.01 | 0 | New |
| Referendum | 601 | 0.01 | 0 | 0 |
| Militant Left | 438 | 0.01 | 0 | New |
| Parti Communautaire National-Européen | 399 | 0.01 | 0 | 0 |
| Humanist Party | 369 | 0.01 | 0 | New |
| Civic List | 242 | 0.00 | 0 | New |
| Paradise Action Party | 105 | 0.00 | 0 | New |
| Other parties | 8,121 | 0.13 | 0 | – |
| Total | 6,214,074 | 100.00 | 150 | 0 |
| Valid votes | 6,214,074 | 93.44 | | |
| Invalid/blank votes | 435,941 | 6.56 | | |
| Total votes | 6,650,015 | 100.00 | | |
| Registered voters/turnout | 7,343,464 | 90.56 | | |
Source: Belgian Elections, Global Elections Database

=== Senate ===
| Party | Votes | % | Seats | | | |
| Party | Votes | % | Won | Community | Co-opted | Total |
|---|---|---|---|---|---|---|
| Flemish Liberals and Democrats | 952,116 | 15.37 | 6 | 3 | 2 | 11 |
| Christian People's Party | 913,508 | 14.75 | 6 | 3 | 1 | 10 |
| Liberal Reformist Party–Democratic Front of Francophones | 654,961 | 10.57 | 5 | 3 | 1 | 9 |
| Parti Socialiste | 597,890 | 9.65 | 4 | 4 | 2 | 10 |
| Vlaams Blok | 583,208 | 9.42 | 4 | 1 | 1 | 6 |
| Socialistische Partij | 550,657 | 8.89 | 4 | 1 | 1 | 6 |
| Ecolo | 458,658 | 7.40 | 3 | 3 | 0 | 6 |
| Agalev | 438,931 | 7.09 | 3 | 1 | 1 | 5 |
| Christian Social Party | 374,002 | 6.04 | 3 | 1 | 1 | 5 |
| People's Union | 317,830 | 5.13 | 2 | 1 | 0 | 3 |
| Vivant | 123,498 | 1.99 | 0 | 0 | 0 | 0 |
| National Front | 92,924 | 1.50 | 0 | 0 | 0 | 0 |
| Workers' Party of Belgium | 35,493 | 0.57 | 0 | 0 | 0 | 0 |
| Party for a New Politics in Belgium | 26,124 | 0.42 | 0 | 0 | 0 | 0 |
| New Belgian Front | 23,382 | 0.38 | 0 | 0 | 0 | 0 |
| Communist Party | 21,991 | 0.36 | 0 | 0 | 0 | 0 |
| Social-Liberal Democrats | 7,446 | 0.12 | 0 | 0 | 0 | 0 |
| Democratic Union | 7,368 | 0.12 | 0 | 0 | 0 | 0 |
| PJU–PDB | 6,372 | 0.10 | 0 | 0 | 0 | 0 |
| VLAAMS | 4,902 | 0.08 | 0 | 0 | 0 | 0 |
| Parti Communautaire National-Européen | 3,110 | 0.05 | 0 | 0 | 0 | 0 |
| Total | 6,194,371 | 100.00 | 40 | 21 | 10 | 71 |
| Valid votes | 6,194,371 | 93.14 | | | | |
| Invalid/blank votes | 456,425 | 6.86 | | | | |
| Total votes | 6,650,796 | 100.00 | | | | |
| Registered voters/turnout | 7,343,466 | 90.57 | | | | |
Source: Belgian Elections
