= Federal Public Service Personnel and Organisation =

Belgian company

The FPS Personnel and Organisation (Dutch: FOD Personeel en Organisatie, French: SPF Personnel et Organisation, German: FÖD Personal und Organisation), also referred to as the FPS P&O, was a Federal Public Service of Belgium. It was created by Royal Order on 11 May 2001, as part of the plans of the Verhofstadt I Government to modernise the federal administration. It is a so-called horizontal Federal Public Service because it isn't responsible for a specific policy field, but provides services to the other Federal Public Services.

It merged into the Federal Public Service Policy and Support on 1 March 2017.
