= Nadia Naji =

Belgian politician (born 1992)

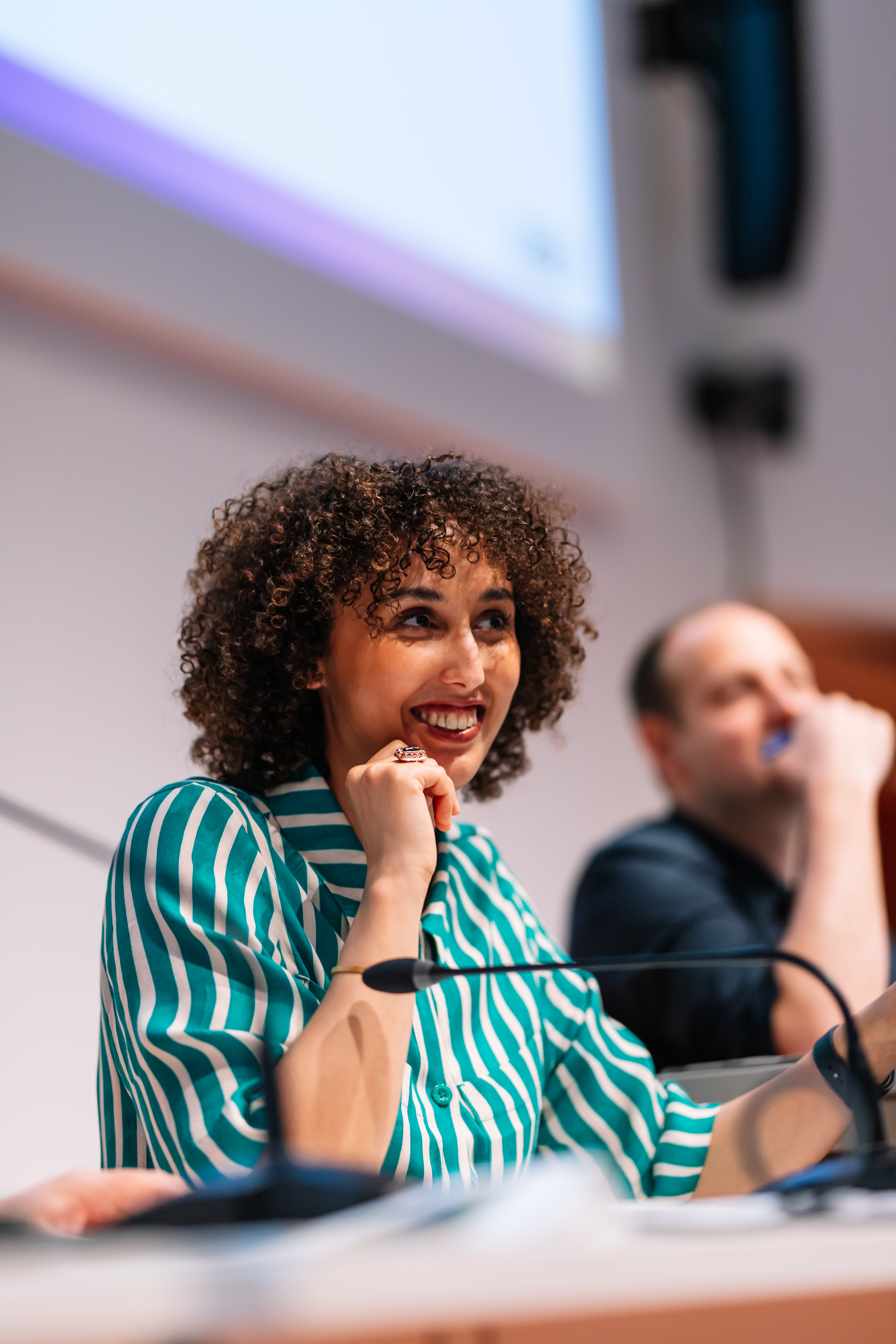
- Naji in 2023

Party Co-president of Groen with Jeremie Vaneeckhout
- In office 11 june 2022 – 26 April 2026
- Preceded by: Meyrem Almaci

Member of the Flemish Parliament
- Incumbent
- Assumed office 2 July 2024
- Constituency: Brussels

Personal details
- Born: 2 February 1992 (age 34) Brussels, Belgium
- Party: Groen
- Website: www.groen.be/nadia-naji

Nadia Naji (born 2 February 1992) is a Belgian politician for Groen. She was co-president, together with Jeremie Vaneeckhout, between June 2022 and December 2024.

== Early life and education ==
Naji is of Algerian and Moroccan descent. Her father is a welder and her mother stayed at home. Naji is bilingual: she spoke French at home but went to school in Dutch. Her family was struggling financially and Naji had to pay for her own education through various student jobs from the age of 16 onwards.

She studied Communication management in Brussels and acquired a masters in Media Studies at the University of Antwerp.

Before entering politics, she worked from 2017 to 2020 as a journalist for BRUZZ.

== Political career ==
From January 2021 until April 2022 she worked as a staff member for Brussels regional deputies Arnaud Verstraete and Juan Benjumea Moreno. In April 2022 she became an advisor to Elke Van den Brandt, minister in the Brussels-Capital Region government.

On 11 June 2022 she was elected party co-president of Groen, together with Jeremie Vaneeckhout. They decided to run as a duo of co-presidents, instead of president and vice-president, following the example of the German Greens and the Belgian francophone Greens of Ecolo.

She was selected to be the main candidate for her party in the Brussels constituency for the 2024 Flemish Parliament elections. She was elected a Member of the Flemish Parliament with 6122 preference votes.

In October 2024 Naji and Vaneeckhout decided to step down as co-presidents, citing the disappointing electoral results of Green in the national, regional and local elections during 2024. They were succeeded by Bart Dhont and Natacha Waldmann.

== Personal life ==
Naji married her partner of seven years on 1 April 2023; they had no guests at the ceremony in Karreveld Castle in Molenbeek-Saint-Jean, and honeymooned in Scandinavia.

== See also ==
- Groen (political party)
