= Annabel Tavernier =

Belgian politician

Member of the Flemish Parliament

Personal details
- Born: 8 February 1989 (age 37) Ostend
- Party: N-VA
- Occupation: politician

Annabel Tavernier (born 8 March 1989) is a Belgian politician active within the N-VA.

== Biography ==
Tavernier was born in Ostend in 1989 and grew up in Schaerbeek. She studied for a master's degree in political science at Ghent University and Lund University in Sweden before doing an internship at the Belgian embassy in South Africa. She returned to education by studying at the Diplomatic Academy in Vienna. She subsequently worked in the Foreign Affairs department in the European Parliament and as an assistant to MEPs in the European Conservatives and Reformists group. In 2019, she was elected to the Flemish Parliament.

Tavernier is the niece of former Groen! politician Jef Tavernier.
