= Jeremie Vaneeckhout =

Belgian politician

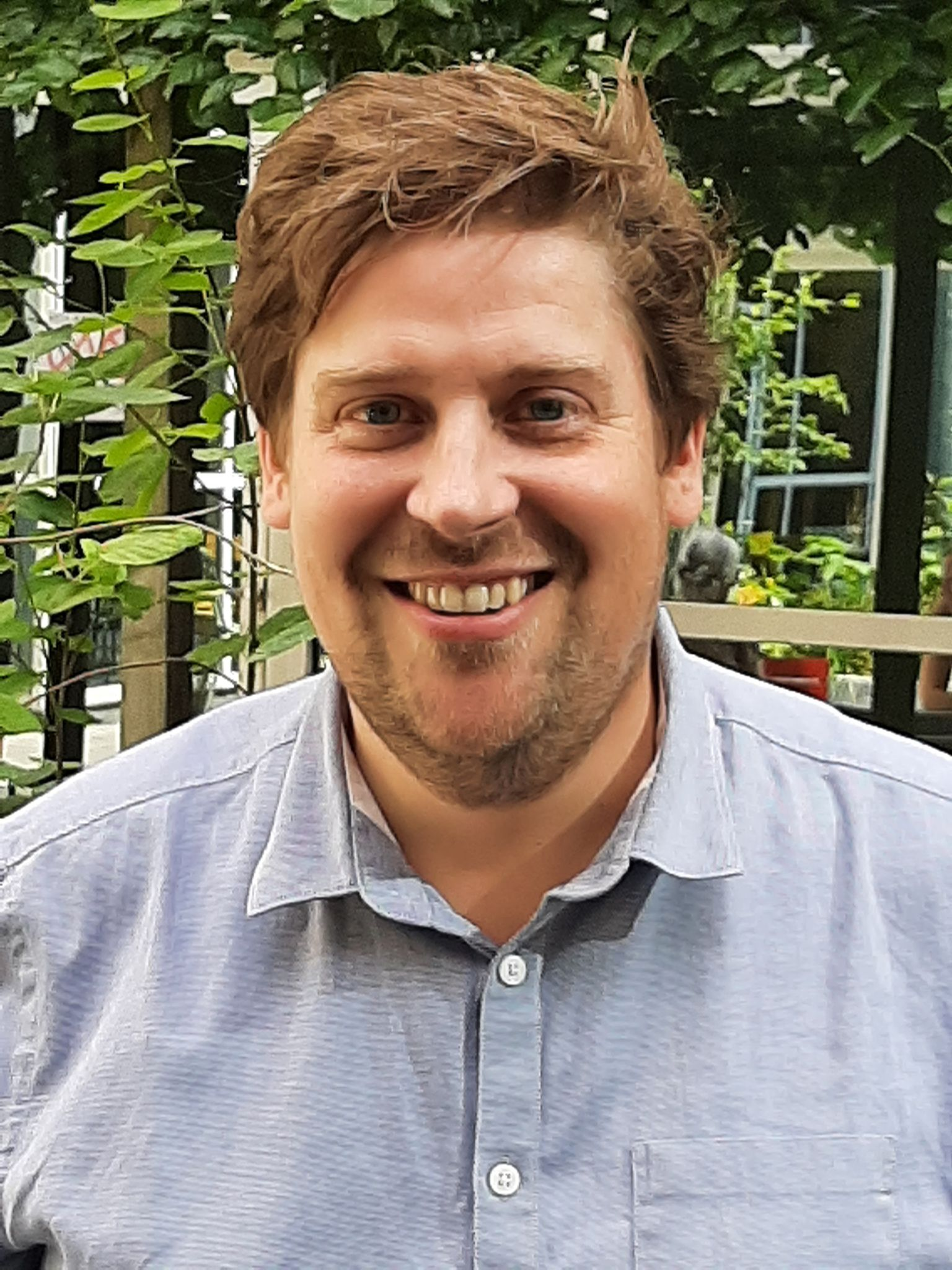
- Vaneeckhout in 2022

Party Co-president of Groen with Nadia Naji
- Incumbent
- Assumed office 11 June 2022
- Preceded by: Meyrem Almaci

Member of the Flemish Parliament
- Incumbent
- Assumed office 18 June 2019
- Constituency: West Flanders

Personal details
- Born: 4 June 1985 (age 40) Waregem, West Flanders, Belgium
- Party: Groen
- Website: www.groen.be/jeremie-vaneeckhout

Jeremie Vaneeckhout (Dutch pronunciation: [ˈjeːrəmi vɑnˈeːkɦʌut]; born 4 June 1985) is a Belgian politician and co-president of Groen together with Nadia Naji.

Vaneeckhout started his political career as a staffer at Groen. First as a local organizer, afterwards as a staff member for representative Kristof Calvo.

He stood as a candidate in the 2012 and 2018 Belgian local elections in his home town Anzegem, and was elected both times to the town council. Between 2013 and his election as a Member of the Flemish Parliament in 2019, he was a schepen in Anzegem.

In 2014 he was elected deputy party chair of Groen, alongside party chair Meyrem Almaci, with 60 percent of the votes cast by party members. He was succeeded as deputy party chair by Dany Neudt in 2019.

In the 2019 Belgian regional elections Vaneeckhout was the main candidate in the West Flanders constituency for Groen. He was elected a Member of the Flemish Parliament with 7,387 preference votes. In 2024 he was re-elected for a second term with 7,903 preference votes.

On 11 June 2022 he was elected party co-president of Groen, together with Nadia Naji.

On 19 December 2024 they were replaced by Bart Dhondt as president of Groen.

== See also ==
- Groen (political party)
