= Magda Aelvoet =

Belgian, Flemish politician (born 1944)

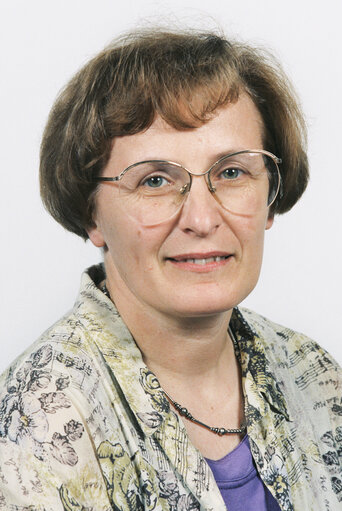
- Born: Magdalena Godelieve Hilda Aelvoet; 4 April 1944 (age 82); Steenokkerzeel, Occupied Belgium
- Occupation: politician

Magdalena Godelieve Hilda Aelvoet (born 4 April 1944) is a former Belgian politician for Groen.

Aelvoet was a provincial senator for Antwerp between 1985 and 1991 and a member of the Belgian Chamber of Representatives for the district of Leuven between 1991 and 1994, when she also served in the Flemish Council. She was a member of the European Parliament from 1994 to 1999, where she was the chair of the Greens. Aelvoet was appointed deputy prime minister and the Minister of Consumer Affairs, Public Health and the Environment in the Verhofstadt I government between 1999 and 2002 and became a Minister of State in 1995.

== Early life ==
Aelvoet was born on 4 April 1944 in Steenokkerzeel. She studied West Germanic languages, and political and social science at KU Leuven. She married Henrard Raymond, a staff member of the VVI, in 1969 and the couple had three children.

== Political career ==
=== Early Agalev years ===
Aelvoet was a member of the Anders Gaan Leven, the Dutch-speaking green political party, and founded the party's chapter in Leuven. She was elected in the Senate for the province of Antwerp on 28 October 1985, a position that she held until 23 November 1991. She was a member of the Senate committees on aid to developing countries, foreign relations, and institutional reform, and a member without voting rights on the committee on infrastructure.

She was a Member of Parliament in the Belgian Chamber of Representatives for the district of Leuven between 24 November 1991 and 18 July 1994. She was a member of the Flemish Council between 7 January 1992 and 18 July 1994 and a member of the Flemish Parliament between 13 June 1999 and 11 July 1999. Aelvoet was a member of the European Parliament from 19 July 1994 to 19 July 1999. She was a representative to the Joint Assembly of the Agreement between the African, Caribbean and Pacific States and the European Union, a delegate to the EU-Turkey Joint Parliamentary Committee and a member of the committee on foreign affairs, security and defence policy. She was vice chair of the Greens from 19 July 1994 to 28 January 1997 and chair from 29 January 1997 to 19 July 1999.

In 1995 she was made a Minister of State for her part in the negotiations of the Saint Michael's Accords.

=== The purple-green cabinet ===
Aelvoet was appointed as deputy prime minister and the Minister of Consumer Affairs, Public Health and the Environment in the Verhofstadt I government, a position that she held beginning on 12 July 1999. She helped to found the Federal Agency for the Safety of the Food Chain in this role. She managed to table legislation on gay marriage, making Belgium the second country in the world to legalise same-sex marriage. She resigned effective 27 August 2002 due to her opposition of a Belgian arms delivery to Nepal. She was succeeded as minister by fellow party member Jef Tavernier.

=== After 2003 ===
Aelvoet pushed Leuven's Green! list in the 2006 municipal elections, and became a city council member, but quit this post in September 2008 to focus on her family. In the 2012 provincial council elections, she was again on the list. She received eighth place on the Green list for the Leuven provincial district, and was also on the list for the Leuven city council. She was elected for the city, although she and Eva Brems decided not to accept the seats in order to allow younger party members to take the position.

In 2013, Aelvoet was appointed by the Di Rupo government to chair the Federal Council for Sustainable Development, succeeding Philippe Maystadt. In the 2018 municipal elections, Aelvoet was elected again to the Leuven municipal council, taking office in January 2019. She remained a municipal councilor until October 2019, when she resigned, in her own words, to make way for young political talent.

== Honours ==
- Belgium : Commander of the Order of Leopold
