= Sara Matthieu =

Belgian politician (born 1981)

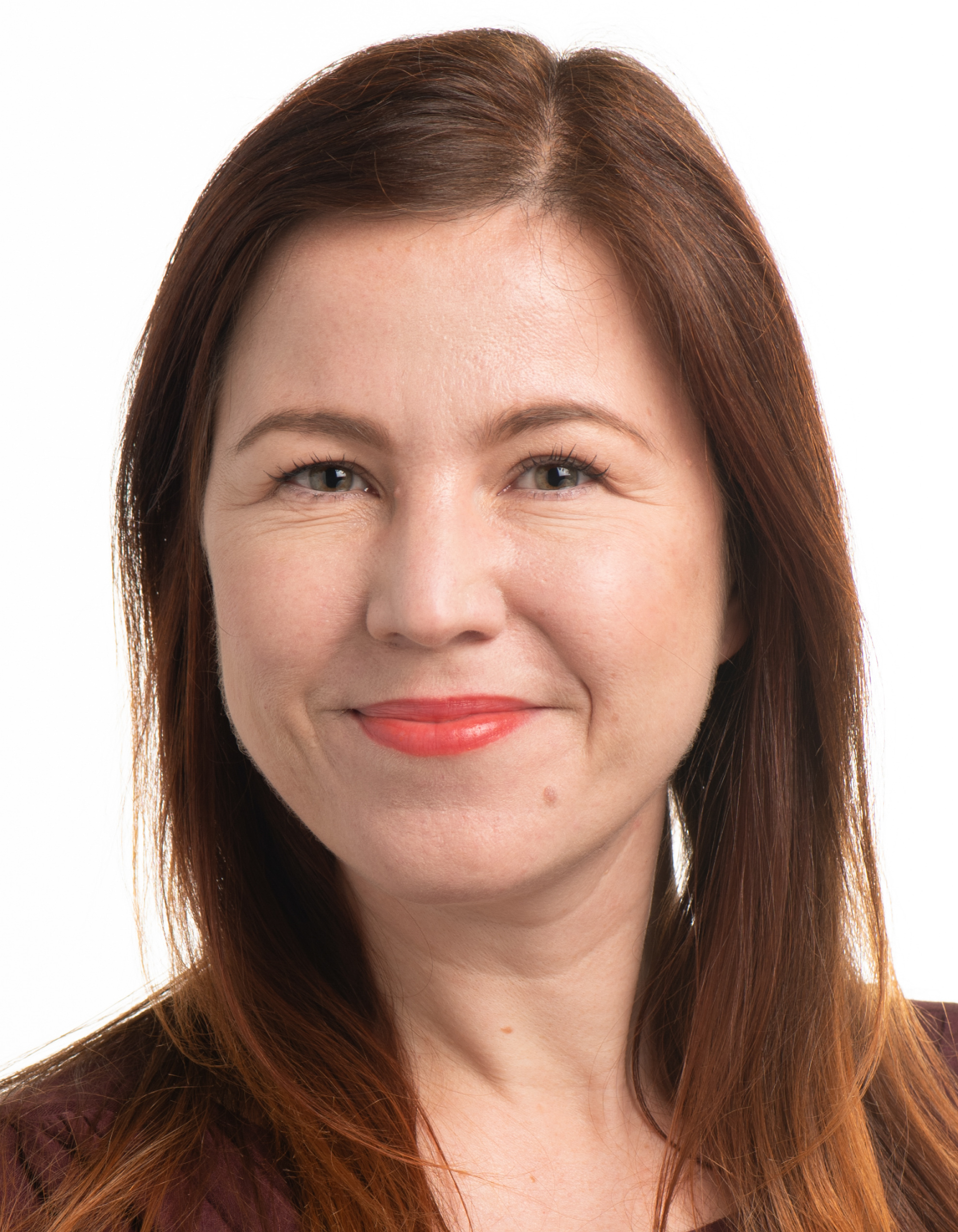

Member of the European Parliament for Belgium
- Incumbent
- Assumed office 8 October 2020

Personal details
- Born: 21 May 1981 (age 45) Aalst, Belgium
- Party: Groen, European Green Party
- Education: Ghent University

Sara Matthieu (born 21 May, 1981) is a Belgian politician for Groen who has been serving as a member of European Parliament for Belgium since 2020 in the Greens/EFA fraction.

== Early life and education ==
Matthieu grew up in Aalst. Both her parents were actively involved with Agalev, the green party of Flanders, Belgium. She studied Moral Sciences in Ghent, and acquired a Master in Comparable Cultural Studies.

== Political career ==
=== Early beginnings ===
From a young age, Matthieu was interested in green politics. When she was seventeen, she became a member of Agalev's youth wing, and three years later, in 2002, she assumed the role of national spokesperson of Jong Groen, the youth wing of Groen.

In 2010 she got a job as political advisor for Bruno de Lille, Brussels state secretary, becoming his chief of staff in 2013. From 2016 until 2020 she was party secretary for Groen in the Brussels Parliament.

In October 2012, Matthieu was elected in the city council in Ghent, to be sworn in in 2013. She continued this role until January 2025.

=== Member of the European Parliament ===
In 2020, Matthieu succeeded Petra De Sutter who had to resign her mandate as Member of the European Parliament to join the government of Prime Minister Alexander De Croo. In parliament, she has since been serving on the Committee on International Trade. In this capacity, she has been the parliament's co-rapporteur on minimum income.

In addition to her committee assignments, Matthieu is part of the parliament's delegation for relations with the countries of South Asia. She is also a member of the European Parliament Intergroup on LGBT Rights.

In June 2024 she got re-elected as an MEP. She is a member of the Committee on Industry, Research and Energy, and continues to be part of the South Asia relations delegation.

In 2026, Matthieu stood as candidate for the leadership of the Greens–European Free Alliance's group in the European Parliament; however, she ultimately lost against Nicolae Ștefănuță and Terry Reintke.
