= Federal Public Service Budget and Management Control =

The FPS Budget and Management Control (Dutch: FOD Budget en Beheerscontrole, French: SPF Budget et Contrôle de la gestion, German: FÖD Hausalt und Verwaltungskontrolle) was a Federal Public Service of Belgium. It was created by Royal Order on 15 May 2001, as part of the plans of the Verhofstadt I Government to modernise the federal administration. It is a so-called horizontal Federal Public Service because it isn't responsible for a specific policy field, but provides services to the other Federal Public Services.

It merged into the Federal Public Service Policy and Support on 1 March 2017.
