= Elke Van den Brandt =

Belgian politician

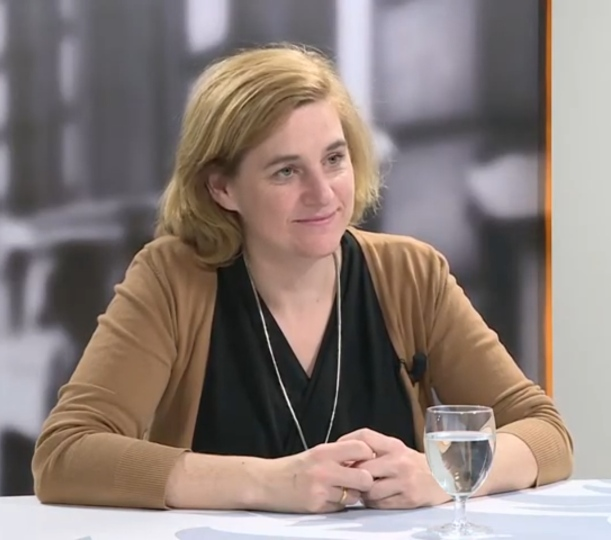

Brussels Minister of Mobility and Public Works
- Incumbent
- Assumed office July 18, 2019
- Preceded by: Pascal Smet, Bianca Debaets

Personal details
- Born: February 21, 1980 (age 46) Borgerhout, Belgium
- Party: Groen
- Education: Vrije Universiteit Brussel
- Occupation: Politician
- Website: elkevandenbrandt.be

Elke Van den Brandt (born February 21, 1980, in Borgerhout, Belgium) is a Belgian green politician and a member of Groen (the Green party). She has been the Minister of Mobility, Public Works, and Road Safety within the Brussels-Capital Region government since July 18, 2019.

== Early life and education ==
Elke Van den Brandt was born on February 21, 1980, in Borgerhout, Antwerp.

She graduated in Information and Communication Sciences from the Vrije Universiteit Brussel in 2002. Since 2004, she has been a scientific collaborator at the same university, focusing on studying the obstacles that both men and women may encounter during their academic careers.

From September 2009 to July 2014, she chaired the non-governmental organization UCOS, specializing in development cooperation.

== Political career ==
A militant of Agalev, which later became Groen, she entered the Brussels Parliament in 2009, following Bruno De Lille, who became a minister in the Brussels government. Within the Brussels Parliament, she specialized in issues related to housing, employment, education, and poverty.

In 2013 she became vice-president of Groen, with Wouter Van Besien being president.

In 2014 she got elected in the Flemish Parliament. Later that year she ran as a candidate for the presidency of Groen, together with Wouter De Vriendt, but they lost from Meyrem Almaci.

During the regional elections on May 26, 2019, she led the Groen list in the Brussels Region. The list secured four seats, becoming the leading Dutch-speaking party in the capital. Elected with 4,320 votes, Elke Van den Brandt became the regional negotiator tasked with forming a majority within the Dutch-speaking community. On July 18, 2019, she assumed the role of Minister of Mobility, Public Works, and Road Safety in the Brussels government led by Rudi Vervoort.

In the 2024 Belgian regional elections Van den Brandt was chosen to lead the Groen list in the Brussels region, and the party became the biggest on the Dutch side. Van den Brandt once again was assigned the responsibility to form a majority within the Dutch part of the Brussels parliament. The negotiations about the forming of a new government ended up taking until February 2016. With Boris Dilliès as minister-president, Van den Brandt finally continued her role of Minister of Mobility, Public Works, and Road Safety, adding Animal Welfare to her responsibilities.

== Personal ==
Van den Brandt is married and has two children.

Elke Van den Brandt was knighted in the Order of Leopold on May 27, 2019.
