= Aimen Horch =

Belgian politician (born 1996)

Party Co-president of Groen with Lien Arits
- Incumbent
- Assumed office 21 March 2026
- Preceded by: Bart Dhont

Member of the Flemish Parliament
- Incumbent
- Assumed office 2 July 2024
- Constituency: Flemish Brabant (Flemish Parliament constituency)

Personal details
- Born: 10 February 1996 (age 30) Oran, Algeria
- Party: Groen
- Website: www.groen.be/aimen-horch

Aimen Imed Edin Horch (born 10 February 1996) is a Belgian politician for Groen. He is the chairman of the party since 21 March 2026.

== Biography ==
Horch is born in Oran, Algeria. When he was five, his family moved to Belgium as refugees. He grew up in Vilvoorde.

He was elected in the town council of Vilvoorde in 2018 at age 22.

In the 2024 Flemish Parliament elections he was the main candidate for the Flemish Brabant constituency. He got elected and became a member of the commissions of the Climate and Energy, Integration, and Home Affairs.

On 21 March 2026 he was elected chairman of Groen, together with Lien Arits.

== See also ==
- Groen (political party)
