= Mieke Vogels =

Belgian politician

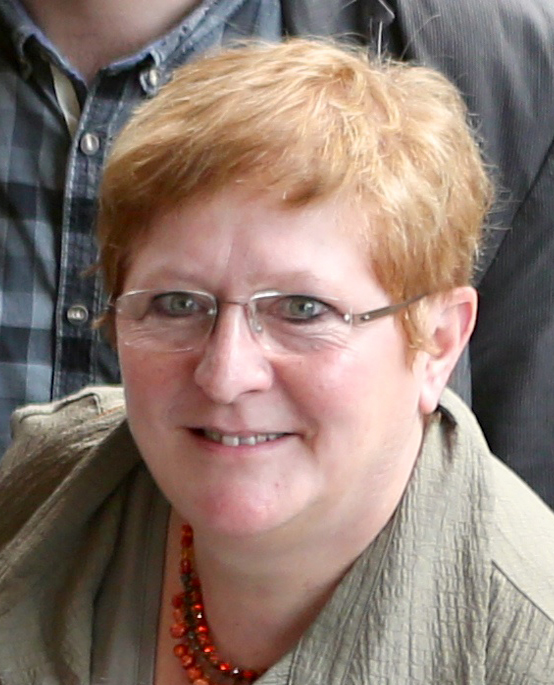

Member of the Flemish Parliament
- Incumbent
- Assumed office 13 June 2004 (7 June 2009)

Chairwoman of Groen!
- In office 10 November 2007 – 25 October 2009
- Preceded by: Vera Dua
- Succeeded by: Wouter Van Besien

Member of Parliament (Chamber of Representatives)
- In office 18 May 2003 – 6 July 2004

Flemish minister of Well-being, Health and Equal Opportunities and Development Cooperation
- In office 3 July 2002 – 26 May 2003

Flemish minister of Well-being, Health and Equal Opportunities
- In office 13 July 1999 – 3 July 2002

Member of Parliament (Senate)
- In office 13 June 1999 – 13 July 1999

Personal details
- Born: 20 April 1954 (age 72)
- Party: Agalev/Groen!
- Education: University of Antwerp
- Occupation: Politician
- Website: Official website

Maria Bertha Charlotte (Mieke) Vogels (born 20 April 1954) Belgian politician from Flanders in the environmentalist party Groen!.

== Education ==
In 1978, Vogels earned a master's degree in Political and Social Sciences from the University Institution Antwerp (present University of Antwerp).

== Political career ==
- 1985 - 1995 : Member of the Belgian Chamber of Representatives
- 1995 - 1999 : Member of the city council of Antwerp
- 1995 - 1999 : schepen (alderman) of Antwerp
- 1999 : Senator of the Belgian Federal Parliament
- 1999 - 2002 : Flemish minister of well-being, health and equal opportunities
- 2002 - 2003 : Flemish minister of well-being, health, equal opportunities and development cooperation
- 2004 - 2006 : OCMW-council member (social services) in Antwerp
- 2004 - : Member of the Flemish Parliament
- 2007 - : Member of the district council in Deurne
- 2007 - October 2009 : Chairwoman of the party Groen!

She quit as minister after her party Agalev was heavily defeated in the federal parliament elections of May 2003. She was succeeded by her fellow party member Adelheid Byttebier.

In October 2006 she was elected for the city council of Antwerp, as well as for the district council of Deurne. From 2007 on, she could only accept one of those mandates, and therefore she chose to continue in the district council.

In November 2007, she was elected as chairwoman of the party Groen!, where she succeeded Vera Dua.

After the elections for the Flemish Parliament in June 2009, her party had to deal with another disappointing outcome. Mieke Vogels decided to give up her position as chairwoman so that a younger generation could take over the lead. She was succeeded by Wouter Van Besien in October 2009. Vogels continues her work as member of the Flemish Parliament till the next elections in Belgium.

== Family ==
Vogels is a niece of Gaston and Louis Crauwels, two missionaries in the Belgian Congo who were killed during the Kongolo Massacre on New Year's Day in 1962.

== Works ==
- Vogels, Mieke (2014). De rekening van de verzuiling (in Dutch). Lannoo Publishers. ISBN 9789401416788.
