= Purple coalition =

Political grouping in some countries

Purple is a common term in politics used to describe governments or other political entities consisting of parties that have red and blue as their political colours. It is of particular note in three countries. In the politics of the Netherlands, Belgium, and Finland, purple (Dutch: paars) is the term for a government coalition of social democrats and liberals, excluding Christian democrats. It is derived from the combination of the colour of the social democrats (red) and liberals (blue).

== Netherlands ==
=== Kok cabinets ===
In the Netherlands the two cabinets of Prime Minister Wim Kok (Kok I and Kok II, 1994–2002) were composed of social democratic PvdA, conservative liberal VVD and social liberal D66.

=== Purple-plus ===
In the 2010 Dutch cabinet formation the possibilities for a "Purple-plus" cabinet (the original purple coalition of PvdA, VVD, D66 as well as GroenLinks) was investigated. Since 5 November 2012, following the 2012 Dutch general election, the VVD has been the senior partner in the second Rutte cabinet, a grand coalition Purple government with the PvdA.

In October 2013 the second Rutte cabinet (VVD and PvdA), which has no majority in the Senate, reached a budgetary agreement with D66 and the smaller Christian parties Christian Union (CU) and the Reformed Political Party (SGP). This occasional coalition is nicknamed "purple plus the Bible" (Paars met de Bijbel) as it includes the purple parties VVD, PvdA and D66 plus the Bible-minded parties CU and SGP. The term "purple plus the Bible" had already been used in February that year, when the same parties reached an agreement on modernising the housing market. Then-Minister of Finance, Jeroen Dijsselbloem (PvdA) called D66, CU and SGP his "most beloved opposition parties". The three parties were influential on the policy of the second Rutte cabinet, because without their support new parliamentary elections were inevitable.

In the municipal elections of 19 March 2014 D66, CU and SGP did well. D66 for instance, became the biggest party in Amsterdam and The Hague, beating the PvdA. The CU became the biggest party in Zwolle, hometown of CU-leader Arie Slob. All three parties were rewarded for their so-called "constructive co-operation" with the cabinet. However, the coalition parties VVD and PvdA lost a lot of seats (PvdA lost its plurality in Amsterdam, The Hague, Rotterdam, Groningen etc. and the VVD did equally bad).

== Belgium ==
In Belgian politics, the term is used as a term for the two federal governments of Prime Minister Guy Verhofstadt, from 1999 to 2008. These cabinets consisted of the Flemish and Francophone social-democratic parties (SP.A and PS) and the Flemish and Francophone liberal parties (Flemish Liberals and Democrats and the Liberal Reformist Party, which later became Open VLD and the Reformist Movement). The first government also included the Flemish and Francophone green parties Agalev (now known as Groen) and Ecolo. In a September 2022 interview, Bart de Wever, mayor of Antwerp, described Belgium as currently "purple-green".

== Finland ==
Besides the Benelux countries, purple coalitions have also been presented in Finland, which have been called "red-blue coalitions" since 1980s. Those governments have been formed by social democratic SDP and centre-right liberal conservative NCP. Larger majority red-blue coalitions have also been called "rainbow coalitions" because large present of the parties from the left-wing via Green League to conservative liberal Swedish People's Party of Finland.

== See also ==
- Black-red-green coalition
- Blackberry coalition
- Red–green alliance
- Red–green–brown alliance
- Red–purple coalition
- Red–red–green coalition
- Roman/Red
- Social-liberal coalition
- Purple state
