= Leo Delcroix =

Belgian politician (1949–2022)

Minister of Defense
- In office 7 March 1992 – 8 December 1994
- Preceded by: Guy Coëme
- Succeeded by: Karel Pinxten

Member of the Flemish Parliament
- In office 1995–1999

Member of the Senate of Belgium
- In office 1991–1999

Personal details
- Born: 21 November 1949 Kalmthout, Belgium
- Died: 2 November 2022 (aged 72) Genk, Belgium
- Party: CVP
- Education: University of Antwerp; KU Leuven; Limburg Universitair Centrum

Leo Delcroix (21 November 1949 – 2 November 2022) was a Belgian Flemish politician. He was a member of the Christian People's Party (CVP).

== Biography ==
=== Political career ===
Delcroix earned a degree in classical philology from the University of Antwerp, a law degree from KU Leuven, and later studied economics at the Limburg Universitair Centrum. In 1984, he became national secretary of the CVP and served as a co-opted senator in the Senate from 1991 to 1995. On 7 March 1992, he became Minister of Defense within the Dehaene I Government, a mandate in which he suspended mandatory conscription. He also carried out reforms within the Belgian Armed Forces with a considerable reduction in the number of soldiers, weapons, and barracks and froze the military budget for five years. He was a founding member of the Eurocorps and increasingly deployed the Belgian Armed Forces for operations in Yugoslavia, Somalia, and Rwanda.

In 1995, Delcroix was elected to the Flemish Parliament, where he remained until 1999. He was also appointed a community senator, a position he held from June 1995 to June 1999. During that time, he was also a Quaestor within the Senate. Delcroix was considered to be on the right side of the CVP and repeatedly questioned the cordon sanitaire within the Vlaams Blok. In 1999, he retired from politics.

=== After politics ===
In January 2001, Delcroix became director of the Maastricht School of Management. He resigned in October 2003 following his criminal conviction for his role in the "Milieubox affair". He received a boarding premium of 150,000 euros.

In April 2010, Delcroix succeeded Paul Kumpen as vice-chairman of De Vlaamse Waterweg, a position he held until 2020. In September 2010, he succeeded Theo Kelchtermans as chairman of Hasselt University. He resigned in October 2019 due to health concerns and was succeeded by Jo Vandeurzen.

=== Controversies ===
In November 1994, Delcroix was criticized over his ownership of a villa in Bormes-les-Mimosas, France, and unreported employment for workers who were employed at the residence. After the insistence of CVP party leader Johan Van Hecke, he resigned from his role as Minister of Defense.

Delcroix was mentioned in multiple judicial investigations related to illegal party financing, such as the Milieubox affair, the Smeerpijp Limburg-Antwerpen affair, and the Superclub-KS affair. However, he was not officially charged in most cases. However, he was found guilty by a tribunal of first instance in 2003 of forgery of documents for his role in the Milieubox affair. On 30 June 2004, he was acquitted by a court of appeal because the offenses were time-barred.

In 2013, Delcroix was again accused of misconduct in relation to the Belgian delegation at Expo 2010 in Shanghai, for which he was questioned by the Court of Audit. The Court stated in 2013 that "so many rules were broken that control of the finances was simply impossible". Despite this, he was appointed Commissioner General for Expo 2015 in Milan two years later. The Court of Audit again criticized the management of the Belgian delegation at the Expo in 2017.

=== Death ===
Leo Delcroix died on 2 November 2022, at the age of 72.
