= Young Green (Flanders) =

Youth organization of Groen

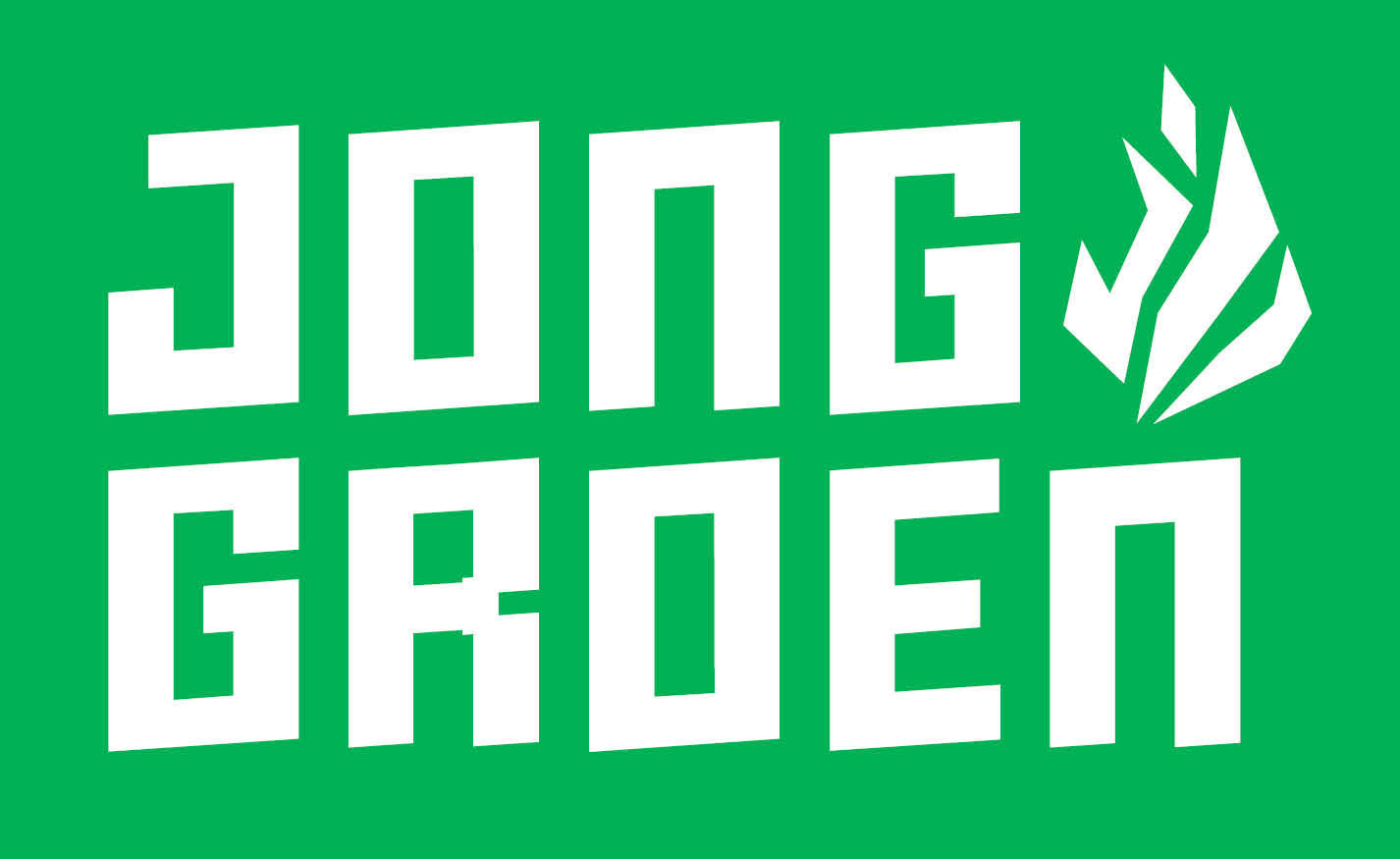

Young Green (Dutch: Jong Groen) is the youth organisation of Groen, the Green party in Flanders and Brussels.

== Origins ==
Jong Groen has grown out of local groups of young Groen members, active since the late eighties and early nineties. These local groups started coordinated action in 1996. In 1998 Jong Groen was officially founded.

== Organisational structure ==
Though Jong Groen is fully integrated into the party (shared membership and shared offices) and subscribes to the same principles and goals, it is politically and organisationally independent.

Jong Groen has now grown into an organisation with around 1000 members, organised in 37 local groups in Flanders and Brussels. The national organisation consists of the Jong Groen Congress, the assembly of all members that decides on the organisation's statutes and its program, and also elects the Board and the spokespersons; the Jong Groen Council, where the representatives of the local groups meet and take a stance on concrete issues; and the Jong Groen Board, which consists of four

Young Green
- Ideology: Ecologism
- Mother party: Groen

elected board members, up to three spokespersons and the chairperson of the Jong Groen Council, and which is responsible for running the organisation.

Jong Groen is a member-organisation of the Federation of Young European Greens.

== Activities ==
Jong Groen organises actions and runs campaigns on a wide range of issues: a CO_{2}-energy tax, open source software in schools, animal rights, green energy, public transport, education, employment, etc. Also, its working groups try to look at most of these issues from the vantage point of young people and try to formulate new ideas. Forum weekends and summercamps are the high points of the year: they are an opportunity for young greens in Flanders and Brussels to get to know each other, to discuss, to find inspiration for new actions and simply to have fun.

== Controversies ==
On 3 April 2023 Jong Groen caused controversy after Groen was polled badly. It claimed the party had too much "old white" people. Certain members of Groen felt offended by this. On Twitter, several people claimed the movement propagated pure racism whereas others said Jong Groen was hypocritical since most of its members were white people from the upper middle class.
