= Jef Tavernier =

Belgian politician

Personal details
- Born: 1 November 1951 (age 74) Aalter
- Party: Agalev/Groen! (1981–2010)
- Spouse: Rita Brauwers
- Occupation: Politician, Teacher

Jef Tavernier (born 1 November 1951 in Aalter, East Flanders, Belgium) is a Belgian politician. He was once member of the party Green! (Groen!).

== Career ==
- 24/11/1991 – 12/04/1995: Senator [directly elected] (constituency Ghent–Eeklo)
- 07/01/1992 – 21/05/1995: Flemish Council member
- 21/05/1995 – 28/08/2002: Representative (constituency Ghent–Eeklo)
- 28/08/2002 – 18/07/2003: Federal minister for Consumer Affairs, Public Health and Environment (replaced Magda Aelvoet)
- 18/02/2004 – 21/07/2004: Flemish minister for Environment, Agriculture and Development Cooperation
- 13/06/2004 – 07/06/2009: Flemish representative (constituency West Flanders)
