= Eva Brems =

Belgian university professor, human rights defender and politician

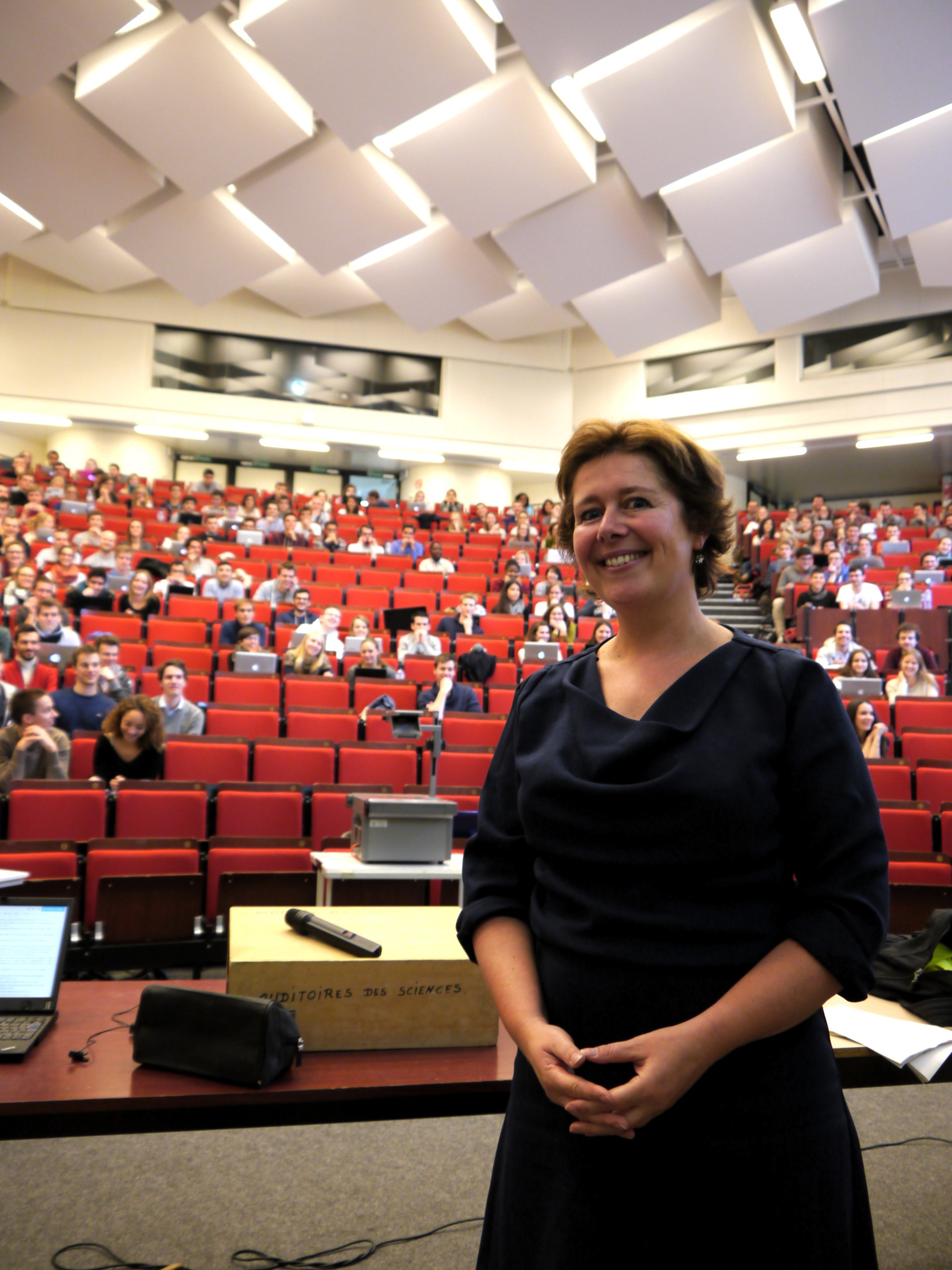

Member of the Belgian Chamber of Representatives
- In office 13 June 2010 – 25 May 2014

President of Amnesty International Flanders
- In office April 2006 – April 2010
- Succeeded by: Karine Vandenberghe

Personal details
- Born: 1969 (age 56–57) Leuven, Belgium
- Party: Groen
- Education: Facultés universitaires Notre-Dame de la Paix; Katholieke Universiteit Leuven
- Occupation: University professor Politician
- Website: Official website

Eva Brems (born 1969) is a Belgian university professor, human rights defender and politician. She is a senior lecturer in human rights and non-Western law at Ghent University. Besides her academic engagements, Brems has also been politically active. From 2006 until 2010, she was the president of the Flemish division of Amnesty International. In the spring of 2010 she announced her candidacy in the 2010 Belgian general election for the Chamber of Representatives. She now represents the constituency of Leuven for the environmentalist party Groen.

== Education ==
Brems attended the Facultés universitaires Notre-Dame de la Paix in the city of Namur as a law undergraduate (1987–1989) and the Katholieke Universiteit Leuven as a law graduate (1989–1992). The first semester of her final year she participated in de Erasmus Programme to study at de Università degli Studi di Bologna in Italy. Subsequently, she attended the Harvard Law School as a Van Waeyenbergh fellow of the Belgian American Educational Foundation and obtained a Master of Laws (1994–1995). Thereafter, Brems completed her doctoral programme at the Katholieke Universiteit Leuven with a dissertation titled "Human Rights: Universality and Diversity" (1999). Furthermore, she followed several Italian, Arab and German courses.

== Career ==
From 1992 until 1994 Brems was a fellow at the law school of the Katholieke Universiteit Leuven, where she participated in a project concerning "Civil and Legal Protection". Between 1999 and 2001 she became an academic assistant in constitutional law at the same university and taught constitutional and administrative law at the University of Maastricht as well (1999–2000). As of 2000 Eva Brems teaches at Ghent University regarding human rights, gender and rights, and rights and Islam.

Besides her academic efforts, Brems is a member of the board of Vormen, a Flemish organisation for human rights education, and head editor of the Tijdschrift voor Mensenrechten (Journal for Human Rights) since 2003. She was president of the Flemish division of Amnesty International from 2006 until April 2010.

Brems became known on a larger scene in 2007, while participating in the popular Flemish TV-quiz De Slimste Mens ter Wereld (The Smartest Person in the World), in which she became third. During the winter of 2010-2011, she joined the quiz once again to compete with the other highest scoring players from previous seasons. She became third as well as best scoring female and winner of the most consecutive episodes.

In the spring of 2010 she announced her candidacy in the 2010 Belgian general election as frontrunner of the constituency of Leuven for the environmentalist party Groen!. She was elected for a seat in the Belgian Chamber of Representatives.

In 2013, she decided not to run for reelection in the upcoming 2014 Belgian federal elections.

=== Timeline ===
- 13 June 2010 – : Representative (constituency of Leuven)

== Publications ==
- Eva Brems, Conflicts between fundamental rights, Intersentia, 2008, ISBN 90-5095-779-X, 9789050957793
- Eva Brems (red), Federalism and the Protection of Human Rights in Ethiopia, Volume 8 van Recht und Politik in Afrika, LIT Verlag Münster, 2008, ISBN 3-03735-940-4, ISBN 978-3-03735-940-2
- Eva Brems, Article 14: the right to freedom of thought, conscience and religion, Volume 14 van Commentary on the United Nations Convention on the Rights of the Child, Martinus Nijhoff Publishers, 2006, ISBN 90-04-14721-7, ISBN 978-90-04-14721-8
- Eva Brems, Human rights: universality and diversity, Volume 66 van International studies in human rights, Martinus Nijhoff Publishers, 2001, ISBN 90-411-1618-4, ISBN 978-90-411-1618-5
