= Petra De Sutter =

Belgian politician (born 1963)

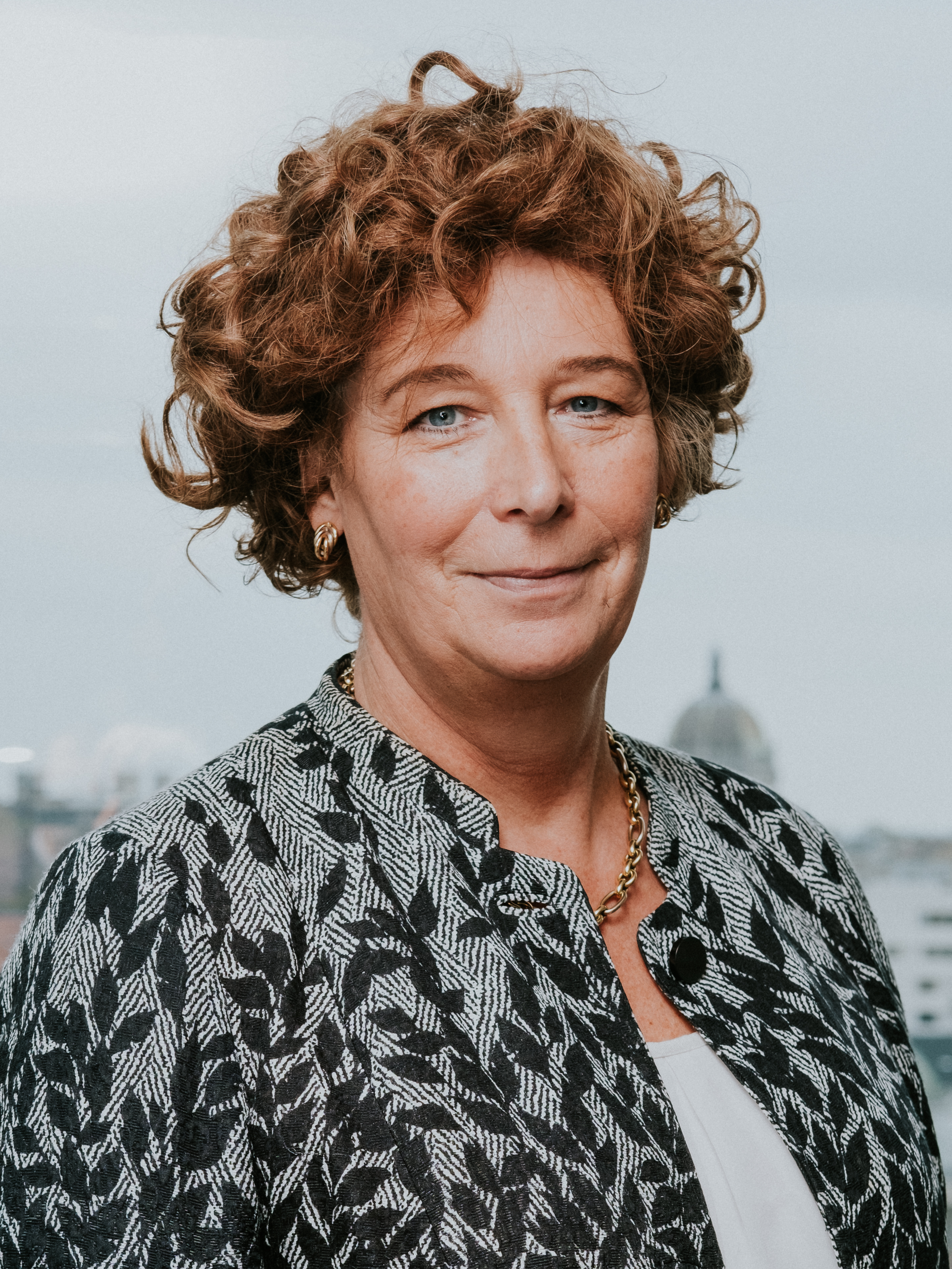
- De Sutter in 2020

Deputy Prime Minister of Belgium
- In office 1 October 2020 – 3 February 2025
- Prime Minister: Alexander De Croo

Minister of the Civil Service, Public Enterprises, Telecommunication and Postal Services
- In office 1 October 2020 – 3 February 2025
- Prime Minister: Alexander De Croo
- Preceded by: David Clarinval
- Succeeded by: Vanessa Matz

Member of the European Parliament for Belgium
- In office 2 July 2019 – 30 September 2020

Member of the Belgian Senate
- In office 3 July 2014 – 29 March 2019

Personal details
- Born: 10 June 1963 (age 63) Oudenaarde, Belgium
- Party: Groen
- Children: 1
- Education: Ghent University
- Website: www.petradesutter.be

Petra De Sutter (born 10 June 1963) is a Belgian gynaecologist and politician who served as the Deputy Prime Minister of Belgium from 2020 to 2025. Following her term, she was elected rector of Ghent University in April 2025.

A member of the Groen party, she was previously a Member of the European Parliament from 2019 until 2020, when she was named Deputy PM with the responsibility of overseeing Belgium's public administration and public enterprises in Alexander De Croo's government. She is the first transgender minister in Europe.

Before entering into politics, she worked as professor of gynaecology at Ghent University, serving as head of the Department of Reproductive Medicine at Ghent University Hospital (UZ Gent).

== Early life and career ==
De Sutter was born in Oudenaarde, in the Flemish province of East Flanders, in June 1963. Her father was a judge. She graduated from Ghent University with a medical degree in 1987 and with a PhD in biomedicine in 1991.

After graduating, De Sutter moved to the United States, spending two years studying oocyte genetics in Chicago. In 1994, she earned a specialisation in gynaecology. In 2000, she was named Professor in Reproductive Medicine at Ghent University. In 2006, she was named Head of the Department for Reproductive Medicine of Ghent University Hospital.

== Political career ==
=== Member of the Senate, 2014–2019 ===
In the 2014 European elections, De Sutter was second on the list for the Flemish Green party. However, the party missed its hold on a second seat. She was subsequently co-opted by her party for a seat in the Belgian Senate. As a trans woman, she became the first openly transgender Belgian to be on a party election list.

In addition, De Sutter served as member of the Belgian delegation to the Parliamentary Assembly of the Council of Europe from 2014 until 2019. As member of the Socialists, Democrats and Greens Group, she was a member of the Committee on Migration, Refugees and Displaced Persons; the Committee on Rules of Procedure, Immunities and Institutional Affairs; the Sub-Committee on Integration; the Sub-Committee on Public Health and Sustainable Development; and the Sub-Committee on Ethics. She served as the Assembly's rapporteur on children's rights in relation to surrogacy arrangements (2016); on the use of new genetic technologies in human beings (2017); and on the conditions of reception of refugees and migrants (2018).

Since her political debut, De Sutter has tackled a regulation for surrogacy at a Belgian and European level, independent clinical research in the pharmaceutical industry, the risks of TTIP for consumer's protection of food and chemicals, and standing up for rights for LGBT people.

=== Member of the European Parliament, 2019–2020 ===
De Sutter introducing herself in a video by the Heinrich Böll Foundation and the Green European Foundation

On 15 September 2018, it was announced De Sutter was seeking nomination as one of the European Greens two lead candidates for the 2019 European Parliament elections, which eventually fell down to the Dutch Bas Eickhout and the German Ska Keller. After joining the Parliament, she chaired the Committee on the Internal Market and Consumer Protection; she was the first Green politician in this position. In 2020, she also joined the Special Committee on Beating Cancer.

In addition, De Sutter was part of the Parliament's delegation for relations with the countries of South Asia (Bangladesh, Bhutan, the Maldives, Nepal, Pakistan and Sri Lanka). She was also a member of the European Parliament Intergroup on LGBT Rights and co-chaired the MEPs Against Cancer group.

In December 2020, De Sutter received the Justice & Gender Equality award at The Parliament Magazine's annual MEP Awards, in recognition of her work as an MEP on sexual and reproductive rights.

=== Deputy Prime Minister of Belgium, 2020–2025 ===
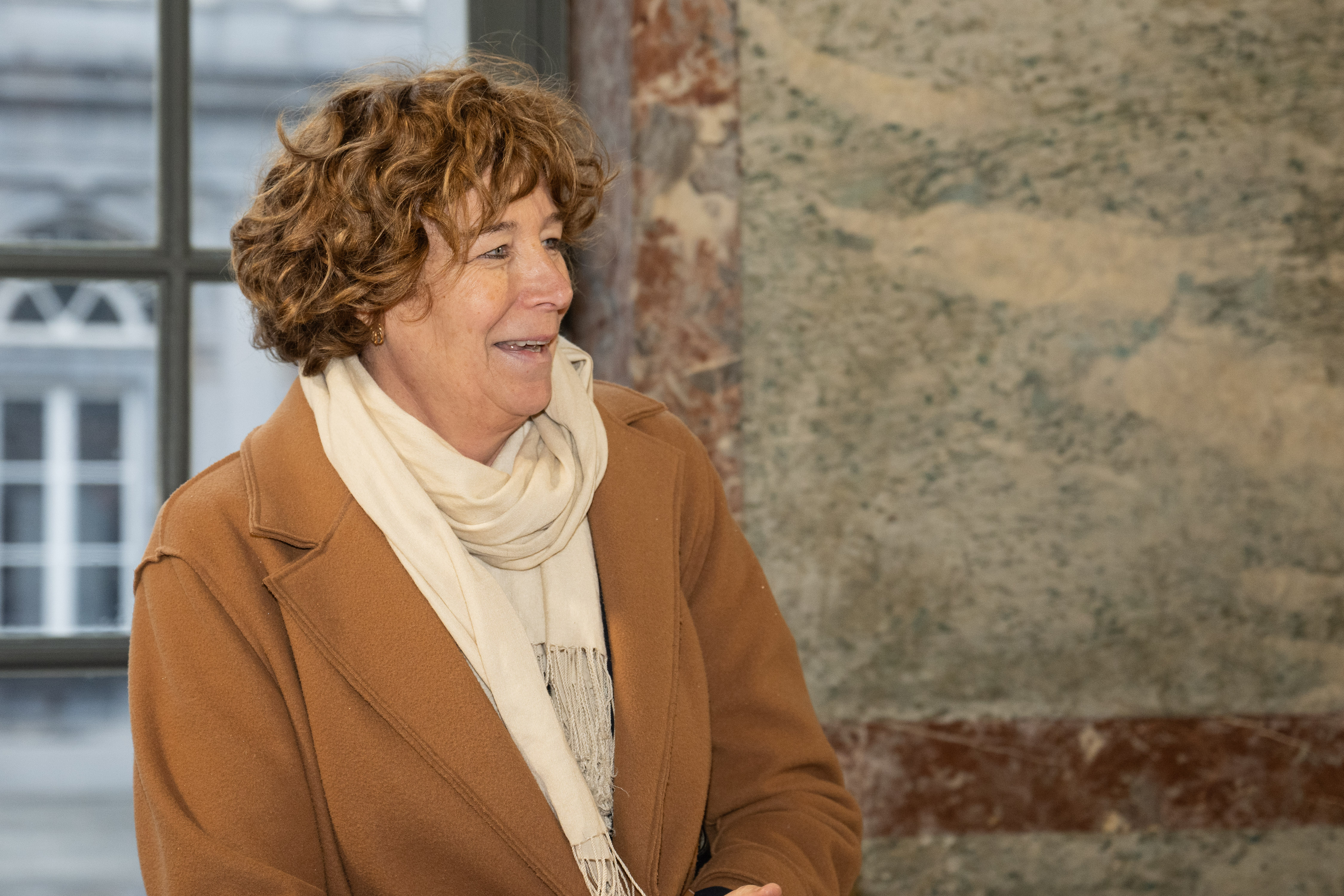
De Sutter in 2024

On 1 October 2020, De Sutter was sworn in as one of seven deputy prime ministers in the government of Prime Minister Alexander De Croo, becoming Europe's first transgender deputy prime minister, and the most senior trans politician in Europe.

In October 2023, De Sutter criticised UK Prime Minister Rishi Sunak's speech at the Conservative party conference where he argued that his audience should not be "bullied into believing that people can be any sex they want to be" and that "a man is a man and a woman is a woman." She described Sunak's words as "hurtful and very disappointing" as well as "fuelling transphobia."

In November 2023, De Sutter criticized Israel's conduct during the Gaza war, and said "It is time for sanctions against Israel. The rain of bombs is inhumane," De Sutter said. She also called on Hamas to release all its kidnapped hostages, and declared that “we must stop the money flows funding this terror organization." On 29 February 2024, De Sutter said she was horrified by the news of the flour massacre.

== University rector ==
Following the inauguration of the De Wever Government in February 2025, De Sutter announced her retirement from national politics while remaining active in local politics. She was elected Rector of Ghent University (UGent) in April that year, alongside Herwig Reynaert, receiving 55.60% of the votes, and assumed the role on October 1. In September 2025, she decided to not join a trade mission to the United States due to "the current rules President Trump has issued," with Politico surmising she was referring to the policies of U.S. President Donald Trump on LGBTQ+ people.

In January 2026, De Sutter, in her capacity as Rector of Ghent University, faced significant public and academic scrutiny following the discovery of fabricated quotes in a speech.

== Personal life ==
De Sutter is married to an artist, Claire, and has a son. De Sutter began her gender transition in 2004.

De Sutter is a trans woman and has spoken publicly about this in publications and interviews. De Sutter was assigned male at birth, but felt like a girl/woman from an early age. Since 2004, when she began her physical transition, she has lived as a woman. She adopted the name Petra so that the initial letter of her first name remained the same, with a view to her list of scientific publications.

== Other activities ==
- Friends of Europe, Member of the Board of Trustees (since 2020)
