= Vera Dua =

Belgian politician (born 1952)

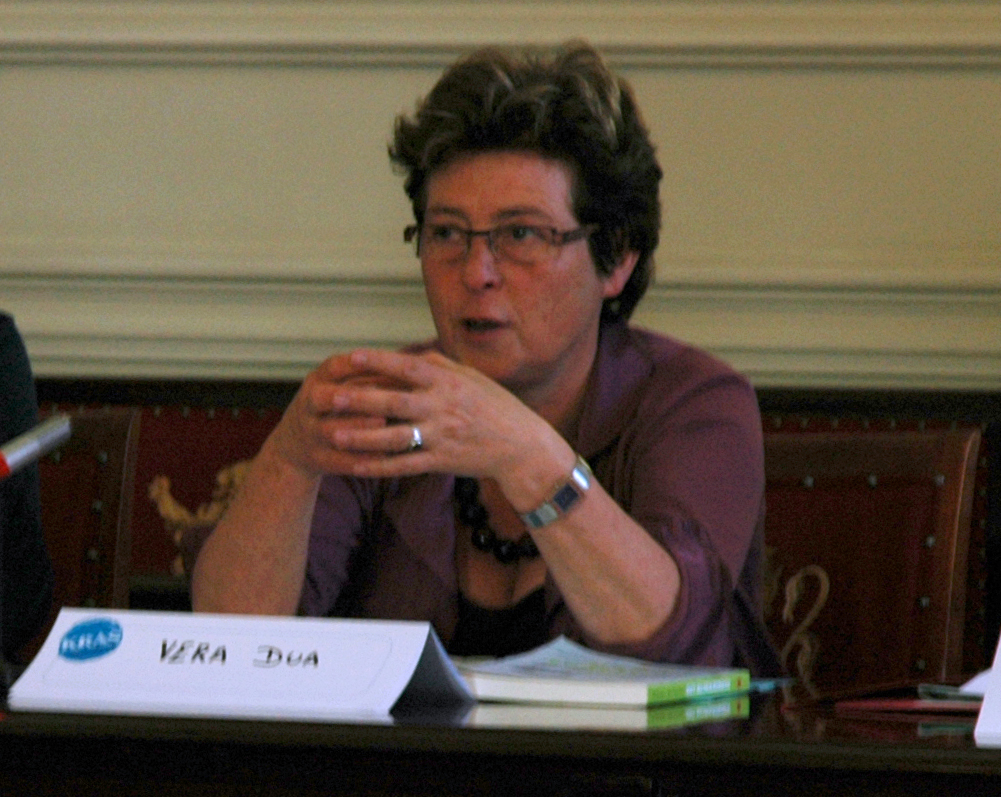

Member of Parliament (Senate)
- Incumbent
- Assumed office 5 July 2007

Chairwoman of Groen!
- In office 15 November 2003 – 10 November 2007
- Preceded by: Jos Geysels
- Succeeded by: Mieke Vogels

Flemish minister of Agriculture and Environment
- In office 1999–2003

Member of Parliament (Chamber of Representatives)
- In office 1991–1995

Personal details
- Born: 25 October 1952 (age 73) Ghent
- Party: Agalev/Groen!
- Education: Ghent University
- Occupation: Politician
- Website: Official website

Vera Agnes Roger Dua (Ghent, 25 October 1952) was the Party Chair of the Flemish green party Groen! between 2003 and 2007. She graduated in 1975 as agricultural engineer and attained a PhD in agricultural science 11 years later.

She has been a member of Agalev since 1984 and appeared in the local assembly of Ghent in 1989. Two years later she was elected to the Belgian Chamber. In 1995 she switched to the Flemish Parliament. After a few years of fierce opposition she became the minister of agriculture and environment. As minister she focused on expanding nature reserves and protecting people's health. After her party suffered a heavy blow in the 2003 federal election she resigned as minister.

On 15 November 2003 Agalev changed its name to Groen! and Vera Dua was elected chairman. In 2007 Mieke Vogels was elected as her successor. She was elected as a member of the Belgian Senate in 2007.
