= Stefaan Van Hecke =

Belgian politician

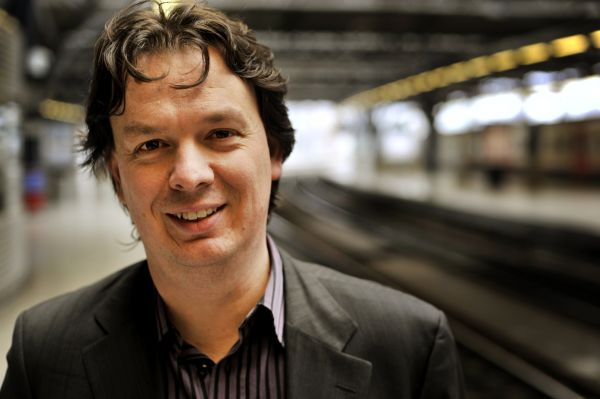

Member of Parliament (Chamber of Representatives)
- In office 10 June 2007 – 12 June 2010
- In office 13 June 2010 – 24 May 2014
- In office 25 May 2014 – 25 May 2019
- Incumbent
- Assumed office 26 May 2019

Personal details
- Born: 4 January 1973 (age 53) Ghent
- Party: Agalev/Groen!
- Education: University of Ghent
- Occupation: Lawyer; Politician
- Website: Official website

Stefaan Van Hecke is a Belgian (Flemish) politician. He is member of the Belgian Federal Parliament (Chamber of Representatives of Belgium) for the ecological party Groen!. He was first elected in June 2007. He was re-elected in 2010, 2014, and 2019.

== Biography ==
Van Hecke obtained a law degree at Ghent University. To learn more about environmental law, he also got a degree in Environmental Science at the University of Antwerp.

== Political career ==
His political career started in 1990, when he joined "Agalev" (the then so-called green party in Flanders) in his home town Merelbeke. In 1992 he founded "Jong Agalev", the youngsters division of the green party, in Merelbeke. In 1996 he was elected into the provincial council. He kept that mandate until 2006.

In the local and provincial elections in Merelbeke, Stefaan Van Hecke changed the provincial council for the city council. He led his party to victory, which led to him being chosen to lead Groen! in the provincial constituency of Eastern Flanders for the national parliament.
