= Verhofstadt I Government =

- Cabinet of Belgium (since 1830)

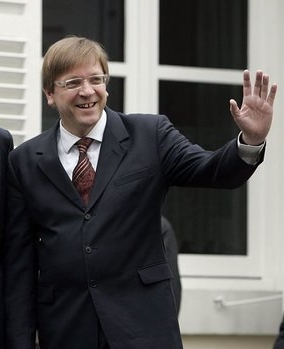
- Date formed: 12 July 1999
- Date dissolved: 12 July 2003

People and organisations
- Head of state: Albert II of Belgium
- Head of government: Guy Verhofstadt
- Member party: Open Vld; PRL; PS sp.a Ecolo; Agalev
- Status in legislature: Majority (coalition) Purple-green coalition

History
- Election: 1999
- Predecessor: Dehaene II
- Successor: Verhofstadt II

Parliamentary support of the government

The Verhofstadt I Government was the federal government of Belgium from 12 July 1999 to 12 July 2003. It was the first government headed by Prime Minister Guy Verhofstadt (VLD). It consisted of the Flemish Liberals and Democrats (VLD), the French-speaking Liberal Reformist Party (PRL), the Flemish Socialist Party (SP), the French-speaking Socialist Party (PS), the Flemish green party Agalev and the French-speaking green party Ecolo. Because it comprised liberals, socialists and greens it was also known as a "purple-green" coalition.

It was the first liberal-led coalition in Belgium since 1938, as well as the first since 1958 that did not include a Christian Democratic party. It was also the first coalition in Belgian history to have included green parties.

== Composition ==
| Minister | Name | Party |
|---|---|---|---|
| Prime Minister | Guy Verhofstadt | | VLD |
| Deputy Prime Minister - Employment | Laurette Onkelinx | | PS |
| Deputy Prime Minister - Foreign Affairs | Louis Michel | | PRL |
| Deputy Prime Minister - Budget, Social Integration and Social Economy | Johan Vande Lanotte | | SP |
| Deputy Prime Minister - Mobility and Transport | Isabelle Durant | | Ecolo |
| Deputy Prime Minister - Consumer Affairs, Public Health and Environment | Magda Aelvoet | | Agalev |
| Interior | Antoine Duquesne | | PRL |
| Social Affairs and Pensions | Frank Vandenbroucke | | SP |
| Civil Service and Modernisation of the Public Authorities | Luc Van den Bossche | | SP |
| Defence | André Flahaut | | PS |
| Agriculture and Middle Classes | Jaak Gabriëls | | VLD |
| Justice | Marc Verwilghen | | VLD |
| Finance | Didier Reynders | | PRL |
| Telecommunications and Public Enterprises and Participations | Rik Daems | | VLD |
| Economy and Scientific Research | Rudy Demotte | | PS |
| Secretary of State | Name | Party |
| Foreign Trade | Pierre Chevalier | | VLD |
| Development Cooperation | Eddy Boutmans | | Agalev |
| Energy and Sustainable Development | Olivier Deleuze | | Ecolo |

The Secretary of State for Foreign Trade and the Secretary of State for Development Cooperation were attached to the Minister of Foreign Affairs. The Secretary of State for Energy and Sustainable Development was attached to the Minister of Mobility and Transport.

== Reshuffles ==
- 8 April 2000: Rudy Demotte resigns as Minister of Economy and Scientific Research and is replaced by Charles Picqué, who also becomes responsible for urban policy.
- 11 October 2000: Pierre Chevalier resigns as Secretary of State for Foreign Trade and is replaced by Annemie Neyts.
- 10 July 2001: Jaak Gabriëls resigns as Minister of Agriculture and Middle Classes. Rik Daems is charged with Middle Classes, Annemie Neyts is appointed as Minister attached to the Minister of Foreign Affairs and is charged with Agriculture.
- 28 August 2002: Magda Aelvoet resigns as Minister of Consumer Affairs, Public Health and Environment and is replaced by Jef Tavernier.
- 5 May 2003: Isabelle Durant and Olivier Deleuze resign, respectively, as Deputy Prime Minister and Minister of Mobility and Transport and as Secretary of State for Energy and Sustainable Development. Laurette Onkelinx is charged with Mobility and Transport, Yvan Ylieff (PS) is appointed as Minister attached to the Minister of Scientific Research and Alain Zenner (PRL) is appointed as Secretary of State for Energy and Sustainable Development, attached to the Minister of Finance.

== Actions ==
Some of the notable actions under this government include:

- Reform of the federal government administration ("Copernicus Reform")
- Fifth state reform
- Legalisation of euthanasia
- Legalisation of same-sex marriage
- Faster naturalisation of foreigners.
