= Pierre Jonckheer =

Belgian economist and politician

- Born: 5 May 1951 (age 74); Namur, Belgium
- Occupations: politician, economist

Pierre Jonckheer (born 5 May 1951) is a Belgian economist and politician, member of the Belgian French-speaking Green party, Ecolo.

== Early life and education ==
Jonckheer grew up in Wallonia and Brussels and studied Economics at the University of Louvain (UCLouvain). During his studies he became an activist in student movements linked to the "Third World" as well as the left radical political movement. He graduated in 1974.

== Career ==
=== Academic ===
Jonckheer became an assistant professor in the Department of Economics of the Catholic University of Louvain. He then worked with different NGOs and in 1982 spent three months in Sri Lanka where he studied the working conditions of the Tamils. From 1984 to 1991 he worked as a researcher for the European Social Observatory (OSE), then became its director. In 1986 he joined Ecolo and in December 1991 he became provincial senator and in 1995, led the Ecolo list for the Senate. During his eight years as senator, he specialised in European politics. In 1999, he was elected to the European Parliament and was re-elected in 2004. In 2008, he co-founded the Green European Foundation (GEF).

Since 1973, Jonckheer has been a professor in the further education universities ISCO, CERGECO and FOPES.

=== Politics ===
In the Belgian Senate, Jonckheer was a member of the European Affairs Committee. During his years as an MEP, he held a leadership role in the European Green Party (EGP) as Co-President of the Green Group responsible for the relations with the EGP. In 2008 Jonckheer co-founded the Green European Foundation and is today its Co-President. The foundation focuses on research, training and publications on Green European issues and organises working seminars and panel debates.

Jonckheer was first elected as first substitute on the European Election list of 1989. This was his first experience of a political campaign. Hereafter, he was designated by Ecolo as provincial senator in 1991. Three years later, he led the Ecolo list for the Belgian Senate and was then directly elected. He was the President of the Green Group at the Senate as well as member of the European Affairs Committee. He also participated in the Enquiry Committee of the Rwanda Genocide.

In 1999, he was elected to the European Parliament. He was a member of the Committee on Foreign Affairs and of the Committee on the Internal Market and Consumer Protection. He joined in the debates of the Services in the Internal Market Directive as well as on the European Constitutional Treaty.
