= Jos Geysels =

Belgian politician

Josephus "Jos" Geysels
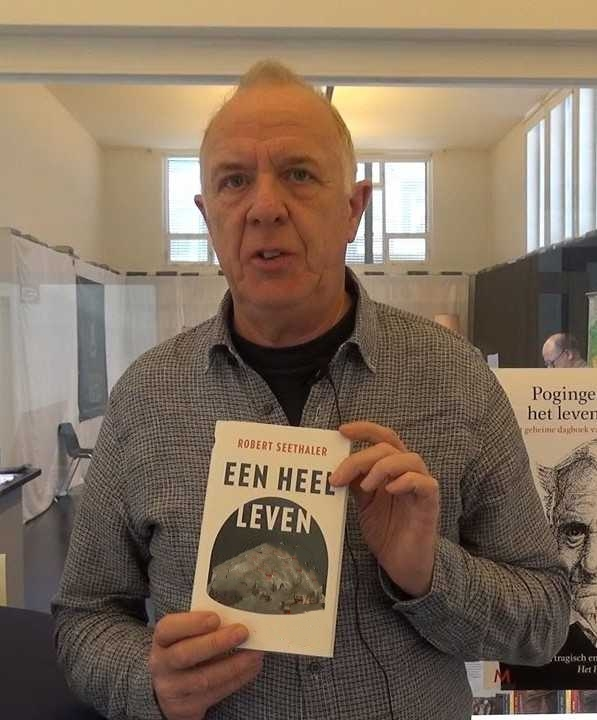

Chairman of Agalev
- In office 1998 – 15 November 2003
- Preceded by: Wilfried Bervoets
- Succeeded by: Vera Dua

Member of the Flemish Parliament
- In office 13 June 1995 – 13 June 2004

Personal details
- Party: Agalev/Groen!
- Education: University of Antwerp
- Occupation: Politician

Josephus "Jos" Elisabeth A. M. Geysels (born 20 September 1952 in Turnhout) is a former Belgian (Flemish) politician, and former Representative in the Belgian Chamber for the ecologist party Agalev for which he was party chairman. He resigned from the post in 2003, taking responsibility for the party's loss of power in the elections.

Geysels obtained a degree in Sociology at the University of Antwerp.
