= Johan Demol =

Member of the Chamber of Representatives
- In office 1999–2004

Member of the Parliament of the Brussels-Capital Region
- In office 1999–2014

Personal details
- Born: Johan Lisette Joseph Demol; 9 June 1957 (age 68) Uccle, Belgium
- Party: Vlaams Blok/Vlaams Belang
- Occupation: Police commissioner, politician

Johan Lisette Joseph Demol (born 9 June 1957 in Uccle) is a former Belgian police commissioner and politician for the Vlaams Belang. He served as the commissioner of police in Schaarbeek, Brussels for a period until it became known he had been a member of the militant Front de la Jeunesse group.

== Biography ==
Demol started his career in 1976 as a member of the Belgian Gendarmerie before becoming a police officer in Brussels in the 1980s. He became the commissioner for police in Schaarbeek in 1994 and was known for supporting strong policies to tackle crime in the area. However, it became known Demol had been a leader within the banned Front de la Jeunesse paramilitary group which had committed a series of violent attacks. He was later removed from the commissioner position.

He was elected to the Parliament of the Brussels-Capital Region as a member of the Vlaams Blok party in 1999 and then appointed to the Flemish Parliament as one of the six first elected members of the Dutch language group of the Brussels Capital Council. He sat in the Flemish Parliament until 2004 and the Brussels parliament until 2014.
