= Kristof Calvo =

Belgian politician

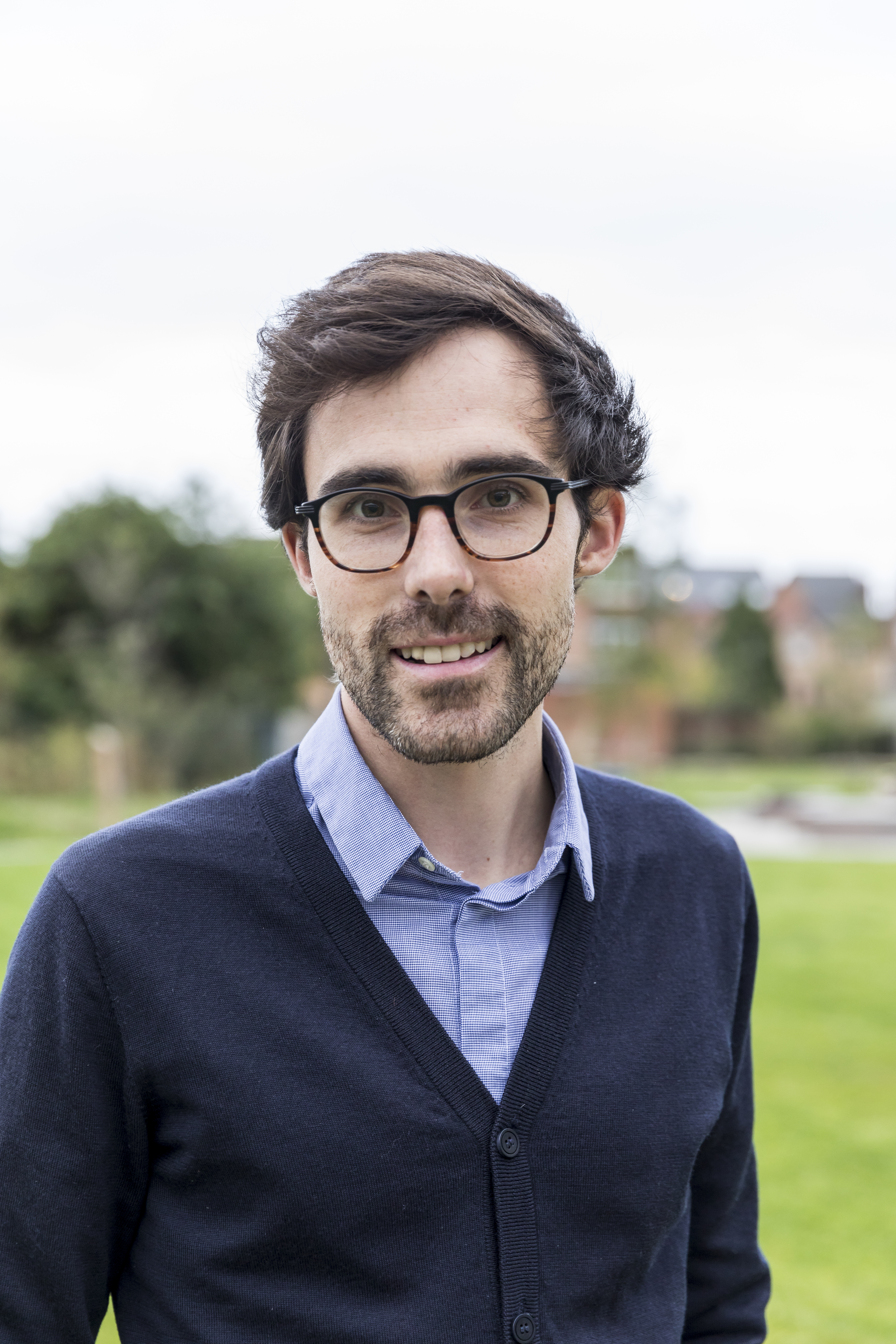

Member of the Belgian Chamber of Representatives
- Incumbent
- Assumed office 13 June 2010

Personal details
- Born: 30 January 1987 (age 39) Rumst, Belgium
- Party: Green
- Education: University of Antwerp
- Website: www.kristofcalvo.be

Kristof Calvo y Castañer (born 30 January 1987) is a Belgian politician. He is a member of the Flemish left-wing green party. At the moment he is a federal representative. In the period 2014-2021, Calvo was rotating parliamentary group leader of Ecolo-Groen in the federal Chamber of Representatives. Since January 2013, he has been a councillor in Mechelen and since 2018 he is the leader of the joint list of liberals, greens and independents in the city council.

Calvo was born in Rumst to a Spanish Catalan father, himself born in Barcelona but who migrated to Belgium with his family in 1960, and a Belgian mother. At home the family spoke Dutch and in 2010 Kristof said to Barcelona newspaper La Vanguardia that he doesn't the vocabulary to speak Spanish and Catalan. He is not a Spanish citizen. In 2010, at the age of 23, he became the youngest direct-elected representative in Belgian history.

During the controversy over the Belgian federal government's attitude towards the 2017 Spanish constitutional crisis, Kristof Calvo took a moderate attitude: condemnation of the violence by the Spanish police against Catalans but pleading for a dialogue between Madrid and the Catalans.

During the 2019-2024 parliamentary session, Calvo focused on social affairs, work, democratic renewal, institutional affairs and European policy.
