= Fred Erdman =

Belgian lawyer and politician (1933–2021)

Frederik "Fred" Erdman (13 August 1933 – 10 April 2021) was a Belgian lawyer and politician. He was a member of the senate (1991–1999) and chamber of representatives (1999–2003), Party chair for SP (1998–1999).
