= Wouter Van Besien =

Belgian politician (born 1972)

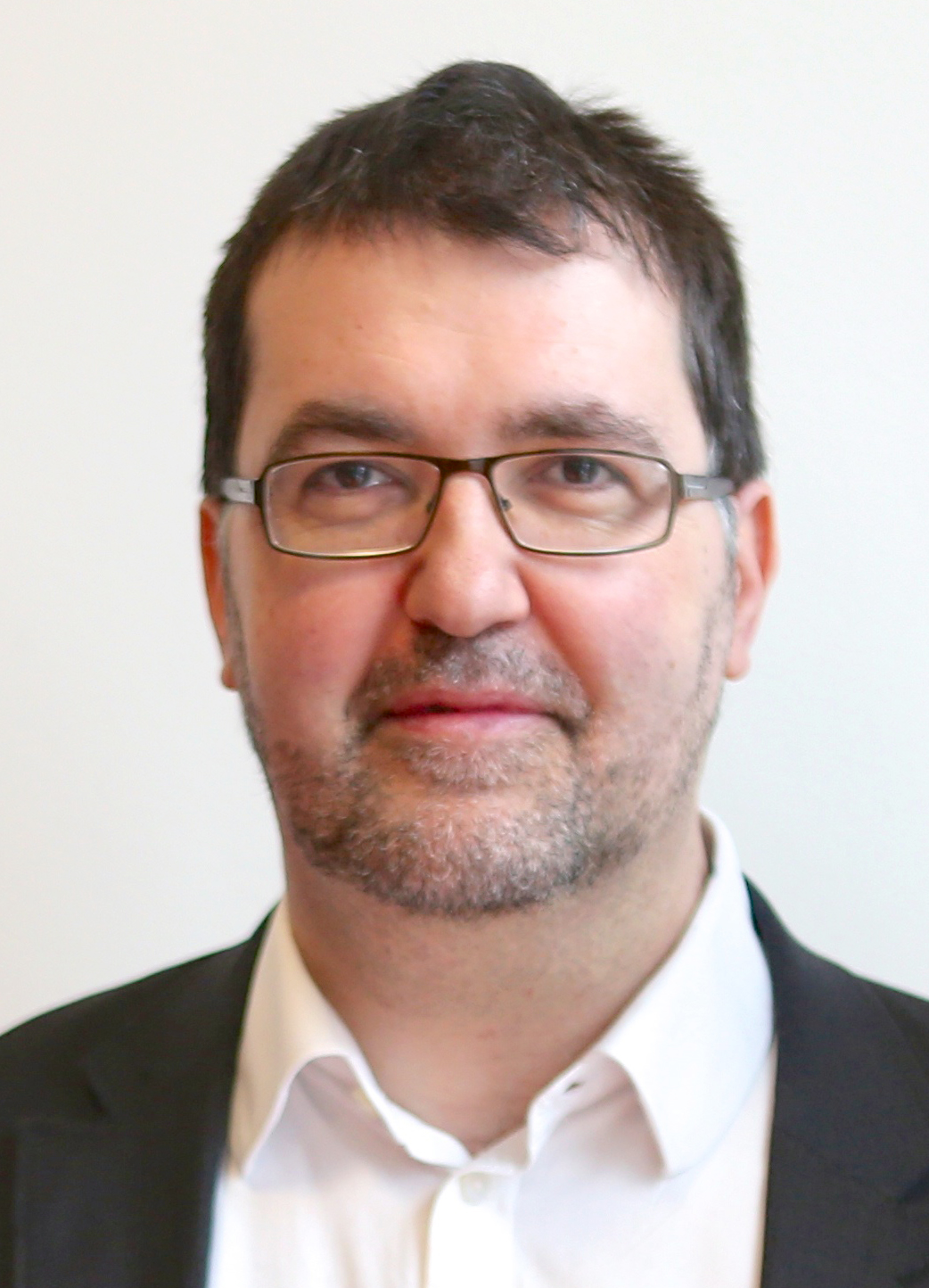
- Van Besien in 2014

Member of the Flemish Parliament for Antwerp
- Incumbent
- Assumed office 2014

Personal details
- Born: 1 November 1972 (age 53) Bonheiden, Belgium
- Party: Agalev/Groen
- Education: University of Leuven; University of Hull

Wouter Van Besien (born 1 November 1972) is a Belgian politician. From 25 October 2009 until 15 November 2014, he was the chairman of the ecologist party Groen.

== Early life ==
Van Besien was born 1 November 1972 in Bonheiden.

He received a master's degree in Sociology at the Katholieke Universiteit Leuven, and obtained a second master's degree in Developing Area Studies at the University of Hull (United Kingdom).

== Career ==
He participated as a youngster in Flemish scouting and became 1998 the national secretary of the Chiro-youth in Flanders.

In 2001, he started working as a member of Agalev in Antwerp. He has been municipal civic office worker in Borgerhout since 2006 and followed Mieke Vogels as president of the Flemish green party Groen. In 2006, he became a member of the district council of (district of Antwerp).

In 2009, Van Besien became chairman of Groen. In 2010, he was re-elected as only candidate in a statute congress of Groen for four years, with a score of 94%. He did not run again when his mandate ended on 15 November 2014 and was succeeded by Meyrem Almaci.

In September 2023, multiple Belgian news sources reported that Van Besien ended political activity in Antwerpen as a city councilor.

== Career ==
- 2006 – 2012: Member of the district council of Borgerhout
- 2013 - : Member of the city council of Antwerp
- 2009 – 2014: Chairman of Groen
- 2014 – 2019: Member of the Flemish Parliament for Antwerp
