= Groen (political party) =

Flemish political party in Belgium

Green Groen
- President: Aimen Horch
- Founded: 1976; 50 years ago
- Headquarters: Van Orleystraat 5-11, 1000 Brussel, Belgium
- Youth wing: Young Green
- Membership (2018): ▲10,000
- Ideology: Green politics
- Political position: Centre-left
- Regional affiliation: Socialists, Greens and Democrats
- European affiliation: European Green Party
- European Parliament group: The Greens–European Free Alliance
- International affiliation: Global Greens
- Francophone counterpart: Ecolo
- Colours: Teal
- Chamber of Representatives: 6 / 89 (Dutch language group)
- Senate: 4 / 35 (Flemish seats)
- Flemish Parliament: 14 / 124
- Brussels Parliament: 4 / 17 (Flemish seats)
- European Parliament: 1 / 12 (Flemish seats)
- Flemish Provincial Councils: 13 / 175
- Mayors: 1 / 285

Website
- groen.be

Groen ([ɣrun]; lit. 'Green'), founded as Agalev, is a green Flemish political party in Belgium. The main pillars of the party are social justice, human rights, and ecologism. Its French-speaking equivalent is Ecolo; the two parties maintain close relations with each other.

== History ==
=== Agalev ===
The party's origins can be traced to the early 1970s, specifically the village of Viersel near Antwerp, where Luc Versteylen, a Jesuit priest, led a youth group. Through this he came to hear about the stress children were suffering from due to an increasingly competitive education system. From this, he and his co-thinkers developed a critique of consumerism inspired by the values of early Christianity as an alternative to the modern Catholic church, rejecting competition and consumption in favour of peace, frugality and community. This critique became central to Anders Gaan Leven (meaning "to go and live differently", a Flemish environmental movement. The movement then established Agalev, a working group formed to contest elections, which eventually became Groen.

Agalev first stood candidates in the 1976 local elections in Antwerp Province, before running across Flanders in the 1978 general election, scoring 0.1 percent of all votes in Belgium. The party's popularity gradually grew, taking 2.33 percent of the Flemish vote in the first European Parliament elections the following year, before making a breakthrough in the 1981 federal election, where they first entered Parliament with two Representatives and a Senator. In the simultaneous provincial elections they took seven seats, with four in Antwerp, two in East Flanders and one in West Flanders. Following this, Agalev officially became a separate entity from Anders Gaan Leven in March 1982, though the two organisations maintained close ties. That year the party won 44 seats in 64 communes in municipal elections, electing 28 councillors in Antwerp, seven apiece in East Flanders and the Province of Brabant, and two in West Flanders and obtaining an average of 5.6 percent of the vote where it stood. The party also co-operated with other ecologists to elect another 12 Agalev endorsed councillors. In the 1984 European elections Paul Staes was elected with 7.08 percent of the vote in Flanders and 9.25 percent of the vote in Antwerp Province. In the 1985 Belgian general election scored 6.3 percent of the Flemish vote, electing four Representatives and three Senators.

In the 1987 Belgian general election, the party won 4.5 percent and 4.9 percent of Belgian votes to the Chamber of Representatives and Senate respectively, electing six members of the former and five of the latter. During the eighties, the party was known for being against nuclear weapons, and for being pro-Europe. According to Sara Parkin, much credit for Agalev's early steady progress and absence of internal conflict has been given to the party's political secretary Leo Cox, who was able to balance the demands of different factions within the party whilst also being able to successfully respond to external political developments.

In 1992, Agalev was asked to support a constitutional change called the Sint-Michiels agreement, which would make Belgium a federation. This change required a two-third majority, so the majority needed to convince some parties of the opposition to proceed. Both Agalev and Ecolo agreed, in exchange for a tax on bottles, the first ecotax in Belgium. However, after the constitutional change was voted in, the ecotax was cancelled and replaced by a watered-down concept.

In the elections of 1999, Agalev scored 7% federally and 11% regionally (in Flanders). The Dioxin affair, a scandal surrounding dioxins in for-consumption chickens just before the elections, played an important role in the Greens' performance. The Greens joined the first Verhofstadt government as part of the "purple-green" federal coalition from 12 July 1999 until 18 May 2003. Representing Agalev in this federal government, Magda Aelvoet was Deputy Prime Minister and the Minister of Consumer Affairs, Public Health and the Environment. She tabled legislation on gay marriage, making Belgium the second country in the world to legalise same-sex marriage. Within the same legislature, Magda Aelvoet left her position due to her opposition of a Belgian arms delivery to Nepal, and was succeeded by fellow party member Jef Tavernier.

Also following the elections of 1999, the party joined the Flemish Government, which was composed of the same parties. Agalev supplied two ministers: Mieke Vogels became responsible for Wellbeing, Health and Equal opportunities, and Vera Dua for Agriculture and Environment.

=== Renaming to Groen! (2003) ===
In the federal elections of 2003, Agalev scored less than 5% and lost all their seats (on the federal level). The next day, Jos Geysels resigned as party leader. The sitting ministers in the Flemish government Mieke Vogels and Vera Dua stepped down, and were replaced by Adelheid Byttebier and Ludo Sannen respectively.

Vera Dua got elected as chairperson, and on the same day, the party's name was changed to Groen! (Green!). The party got between 5 and 10% of the votes through the elections of the early 00's. They did not participate in a governmental coalition (on any level higher than local).

=== Groen (2012–present) ===
In 2012 the party decided to drop de exclamation mark of their name.

After the local and provincial elections of 2014, Groen had a mandate for the first time in the province of Flemish-Brabant. In 2018 the province of East-Flanders followed. The results in Flemish-Brabant had improved though Green wasn't part of the coalition anymore after these elections.

In 2019, there were elections on the regional, federal and European level. At this time the school strike for climate movement had dominated the media, so the party Groen was expected to grow substantially. An total victory didn't happen, though the party gained seats on all levels.

On the regional level of Brussels-Capital, Groen participated in a red-green-blue coalition. Elke Van den Brandt became Minister of Mobility, Public Works, and Road Safety.

On the federal level, a new government wasn't formed until 17 March 2020, when the coronavirus outbreak urged a minority government with extra plenary powers to be formed. After 6 months a 'regular' majority government was formed and the Vivaldi coalition was sworn in with 2 Groen ministers. Petra De Sutter became Deputy Prime Minister and Minister of Civil Service, Public Enterprises, Telecommunication and Postal Services, as Europe's first transgender deputy prime minister. Tinne Van der Straeten holds the Ministry of Energy.

In 2022 the members of Groen elected new party leaders: the duo Nadia Naji and Jeremie Vaneeckhout, and the logo changed from green only to a more colourful background.

== Political views ==
Groen is a progressive Flemish party that, as the name itself suggests, considers environmental and climate policy very important. The party wants to combine this with attention to social justice, equal opportunities, human rights and quality of life. In other words, the party wants to protect the planet, but wants to do so by paying attention to the weakest in society. The party therefore wants good and affordable health care and to tackle poverty. In order to afford these initiatives, the party expect the richest people and the biggest polluters in society to contribute more.

== Party chairperson ==
Name		From	Until	Vice-chairperson	Comments
1	Leo Cox	28 March 1982	7 January 1989	not applicable	Spokesperson
2	Johan Malcorps	7 January 1989	6 June 1995	not applicable	Spokesperson
3	Wilfried Bervoets	6 June 1995	24 July 1998	not applicable	Spokesperson. Passed away in function. During his illness, Jos Geysels was acting spokesperson.
4	Jos Geysels	8 June 1998	21 June 2003	not applicable	Spokesperson
5	Dirk Holemans	21 June 2003	15 November 2003	not applicable	Spokesperson
6	Vera Dua	15 November 2003	10 November 2007	not applicable	
7	Mieke Vogels	10 November 2007	25 October 2009	Wouter Van Besien (from 17 May 2008)	
8	Wouter Van Besien	25 October 2009	15 November 2014	Björn Rzoska (until 19 January 2013); Elke Van den Brandt (from 19 January 2013)	
9	Meyrem Almaci	15 November 2014	11 June 2022	Jeremie Vaneeckhout (until 19 October 2019); Dany Neudt (from 19 October 2019)	Re-elected
10	Jeremie Vaneeckhout and Nadia Naji	11 June 2022	19 December 2024	not applicable	
11	Bart Dhondt	19 December 2024	21 March 2026	Natacha Waldmann	
12	Aimen Horch	21 March 2026		Lien Arits	

== Current mandates ==
=== European politics ===
European Parliament
Name	Committees
Sara Matthieu	International Trade; Employment and Social Affairs

=== Federal politics ===
Chamber of Representatives
Name	Notes
(West Flanders) Wouter De Vriendt	Faction leader
(Antwerp Province) Kim Buyst	
(Antwerp Province) Kristof Calvo	
(Limburg (Belgium)) Barbara Cremers	
(Flemish Brabant) Eva Platteau	
(Flemish Brabant) Dieter Van Besien	
(East Flanders) Stefaan Van Hecke	
(East Flanders) Kathleen Pisman	

Senate
Type	Name	Notes
Co-opted Senator	(East Flanders) Fourat Ben Chikha	Second vice president of the Senate
Community Senator	(Brussels) Stijn Bex	
Community Senator	(Brussels) Soetkin Hoessen	
Community Senator	(Flemish Brabant) Chris Steenwegen	

Belgian Federal De Croo Government
Public Office	Name	Function
Deputy Prime Minister	Petra De Sutter	Minister of Civil Service, Public Enterprises, Telecommunication and Postal Services
Minister	Tinne Van der Straeten	Minister of Energy

=== Regional politics: Flanders ===
Flemish Parliament
(Antwerp Province) Meyrem Almaci	(Antwerp Province) Imade Annouri	(Brussels) Stijn Bex
(Limburg (Belgium)) Johan Danen	(Flemish Brabant) Ann De Martelaer	(Brussels) Celia Groothedde
(East Flanders) Elisabeth Meuleman	(Flemish Brabant) Ann Moerenhout	(Antwerp Province) Staf Aerts
(East Flanders) Bjorn Rzoska	(East Flanders) Mieke Schauvliege	(Limburg (Belgium)) Chris Steenwegen
(Antwerp Province) Tine van den Brande	(West Flanders) Jeremie Vaneeckhout	

=== Regional politics: Brussels ===
Parliament of the Brussels-Capital Region
Name	Notes
Juan Benjumea Moreno	
Lotte Stoops	
Soetkin Hoessen	
Arnaud Verstraete	Faction Leader

Brussels Regional Government Vervoort II
Public Office	Name	Function
Minister	Elke Van den Brandt	Mobility and Public Works

== Election results ==
=== Chamber of Representatives ===
Election	Votes	%	Seats	+/−	Government	Elected members of parliament
1977	2,435	0.0	0 / 212		Extra-parliamentary	
1978	5,556	0.1	0 / 212	0	Extra-parliamentary	
1981	138,575	2.3	2 / 212	▲2	Opposition	Ludo Dierickx, Fernand Geyselings
1985	226,758	3.7	4 / 212	▲2	Opposition	Ludo Dierickx, Mieke Vogels
1987	275,437	4.5	6 / 212	▲2	Opposition	Jozef Cuyvers, Wilfried De Vlieghere, Jos Geysels, Hugo Van Dienderen, Wilfried Van Durme, Mieke Vogels
1991	299,550	4.9	7 / 212	▲1	Opposition	Magda Aelvoet (until 20 July 1994) → Lodewijk Steenwegen, Luc Barbé, Wilfried De Vlieghere, Vera Dua, Jos Geysels, Hugo Van Dienderen, Mieke Vogels (until 11 January 1995) → Peter Luyten
1995	269,058	4.4	5 / 150	▼2	Opposition	Frans Lozie, Jef Tavernier, Hugo Van Dienderen, Lode Vanoost, Joos Wauters
1999	434,449	7.0	9 / 150	▲4	Coalition	Eddy Boutmans (until 12 October 1999) → Leen Laenens, Anne-Mie Descheemaeker, Kristien Grauwels, Simonne Leen, Fauzaya Talhaoui, Jef Tavernier (until 28 August 2002) → Liliane De Cock, Peter Vanhoutte, Lode Vanoost, Joos Wauters
2003	162,205	2.5	0 / 150	▼9	Extra-parliamentary	
2007	265,828	4.0	4 / 150	▲4	Opposition	(Antwerp Province) Meyrem Almaci, (West Flanders) Wouter De Vriendt, (Brussels) Tinne Van der Straeten, (East Flanders) Stefaan Van Hecke
2010	285,989	4.4	5 / 150	▲1	Opposition	(Antwerp Province) Meyrem Almaci, (Flemish Brabant) Eva Brems, (Antwerp Province) Kristof Calvo, (West Flanders) Wouter De Vriendt, (East Flanders) Stefaan Van Hecke
2014	358,947	5.3	6 / 150	▲1	Opposition	(Antwerp Province) Meyrem Almaci, (Antwerp Province) Kristof Calvo, (East Flanders) Stefaan Van Hecke, (East Flanders) Evita Willaert, (West Flanders) Wouter De Vriendt, (Flemish Brabant) Anne Dedry
2019	413,836	6.1	8 / 150	▲2	External support (2020)	(Antwerp Province) Kim Buyst, (Antwerp Province) Kristof Calvo, (Limburg (Belgium)) Barbara Creemers, (West Flanders) Wouter De Vriendt, (Flemish Brabant) Jessica Soors (until 2020) → (Flemish Brabant) Eva Platteau, (East Flanders) Stefaan Van Hecke, (Flemish Brabant) Dieter Van Besien, (East Flanders) Kathleen Pisman
2019	413,836	6.1	8 / 150	▲2	Coalition (2020–2025)	(Antwerp Province) Kim Buyst, (Antwerp Province) Kristof Calvo, (Limburg (Belgium)) Barbara Creemers, (West Flanders) Wouter De Vriendt, (Flemish Brabant) Jessica Soors (until 2020) → (Flemish Brabant) Eva Platteau, (East Flanders) Stefaan Van Hecke, (Flemish Brabant) Dieter Van Besien, (East Flanders) Kathleen Pisman
2024	324,608	4.7	6 / 150	▼2	Opposition	

=== Senate ===
Election	Votes	%	Seats	+/−
1977	3,270	0.1	0 / 106	
1978			0 / 106	
1981	121,016	2.0	1 / 106	▲1
1985	229,206	3.8	2 / 106	▲1
1987	299,049	4.9	3 / 105	▲1
1991	314,360	5.1	5 / 70	▲2
1995	223,355	3.7	1 / 40	▼4
1999	438,931	7.1	3 / 40	▲2
2003	161,024	2.5	0 / 40	▼3
2007	241,151	3.6	1 / 40	▲1
2010	251,605	3.9	1 / 40	0

=== Regional: Brussels ===
Election	Votes	%		Seats	+/−	Government	Elected Members of parliament
Election	Votes	D.E.C.	Overall	Seats	+/−	Government	Elected Members of parliament
1989	4,821		1.1 (#12)	1 / 75		Opposition	Dolf Cauwelier
1995	3,906		1.0 (#11)	0 / 75	▼1	Opposition	
1999 (Note: In coalition with SP)	13,223	21.8 (#4)	3.1 (#8)	0 / 75	0	Opposition	Adelheid Byttebier (until 6 June 2003; replaced Mieke Vogels as Flemish minister) → Anne Van Asbroeck (SP.A)
2004	6,132	9.8 (#5)	1.4 (#10)	1 / 89	▲1	Opposition	Adelheid Byttebier
2009	5,806	11.2 (#5)	1.3 (#10)	2 / 89	▲1	Coalition	Bruno De Lille (became Brussels-Capital Region state secretary) → Elke Van den Brandt, Annemie Maes
2014	9,551	17.9 (#5)	2.1 (#9)	3 / 89	▲1	Opposition	Bruno De Lille, Annemie Maes, Arnaud Verstraete
2019	14,425	20.6 (#1)	3.1 (#7)	4 / 89	▲1	Coalition	Elke Van den Brandt (became minister ) → Soetkin Hoessen, Arnaud Verstraete, Lotte Stoops, Juan Benjumea Moreno
2024	18,345	22.82 (#1)		4 / 89	0	TBD	

=== Regional: Flemish Parliament ===
Election	Votes	%	Seats	+/−	Government	Elected representatives
1995	267,155	7.1 (#6)	7 / 124		Opposition	(East Flanders) Vera Dua, (Antwerp Province) Jos Geysels, (Antwerp Province) Johan Malcorps, (Limburg (Belgium)) Ludo Sannen, (East Flanders) Jos Stassen, (Antwerp Province) Ria Van Den Heuvel, (Flemish Brabant) Cecile Verwimp
1999	451,361	11.6 (#5)	12 / 124	▲5	Coalition	(Flemish Brabant) Magda Aelvoet (until 12 July 1999; became federal minister) → Ann De Martelaer, (West Flanders) Veerle Declercq, (Antwerp Province) Jos Geysels, (Flemish Brabant) Eloi Glorieux, (East Flanders) Dirk Holemans, (Antwerp Province) Johan Malcorps, (West Flanders) Frans Ramon, (Limburg (Belgium)) Ludo Sannen (until 26 May 2003; replaced Vera Dua as Flemish minister) → Flor Ory (until 17 February 2004) → Ludo Sannen, (East Flanders) Jos Stassen, (Antwerp Province) Ria Van Den Heuvel, (Antwerp Province) Jo Vermeulen, (East Flanders) Vera Dua (became Flemish minister) → Isabel Vertriest (until 26 May 2003) → Vera Dua
2004	308,898	7.6 (#5)	6 / 124	▼6	Opposition	(Antwerp Province) Rudi Daems, (East Flanders) Vera Dua, (Flemish Brabant) Eloi Glorieux, (East Flanders) Jos Stassen, (West Flanders) Jef Tavernier, (Antwerp Province) Mieke Vogels
2009	278,211	6.8 (#7)	7 / 124	▲1	Opposition	(West Flanders) Bart Caron, (East Flanders) Elisabeth Meuleman, (Antwerp Province) Dirk Peeters, (Flemish Brabant) Hermes Sanctorum, (Brussels) Luckas Vander Taelen, (Antwerp Province) Mieke Vogels, (East Flanders) Filip Watteeuw (until 31 December 2012)
2014	365,779	8.7 (#5)	10 / 124	▲3	Opposition	(Antwerp Province) Imade Annouri, (West Flanders) Bart Caron, (Limburg (Belgium)) Johan Danen, (East Flanders) Elisabeth Meuleman, (Flemish Brabant) Ann Moerenhout, (Antwerp Province) Ingrid Pira, (East Flanders) Bjorn Rzoska, (Flemish Brabant) Hermes Sanctorum (until 2016; became independent), (Antwerp Province) Wouter Van Besien, (Brussels) Elke Van den Brandt
2019	428,696	10.1 (#5)	14 / 124	▲4	Opposition	(Antwerp Province) Meyrem Almaci, (West Flanders) Jeremie Vaneeckhout, (Limburg (Belgium)) Johan Danen, (East Flanders) Björn Rzoska, (Flemish Brabant) An Moerenhout, (Brussels) Stijn Bex, (East Flanders) Mieke Schauvliege, (Flemish Brabant) Chris Steenwegen, (Antwerp Province) Imade Annouri, (Brussels) Celia Groothedde, (East Flanders) Elisabeth Meuleman, (Flemish Brabant) Ann De Martelaer, (Antwerp Province) Staf Aerts, (Antwerp Province) Tine Van den Brande
2024	304,688	7.17	9 / 124	▼5	Opposition	

=== European Parliament ===
Election	List leader	Votes	%		Seats	+/−	EP Group
Election	List leader	Votes	D.E.C.	Overall	Seats	+/−	EP Group
1979	Paul Staes	77,986	2.33 (#5)	1.43	0 / 24	New	−
1984	Paul Staes	246,712	7.08 (#5)	4.31	1 / 24	▲1	RBW
1989	Paul Staes	446,539	12.20 (#4)	7.57	1 / 24	0	G
1994	Magda Aelvoet	396,198	10.73 (#5)	6.64	1 / 25	0	G
1999	Patsy Sörensen	464,042	11.98 (#6)	7.50	2 / 25	▲1	Greens/EFA
2004	Bart Staes	320,874	7.99 (#5)	4.94	1 / 24	▼1	Greens/EFA
2009	Bart Staes	322,149	7.90 (#6)	4.90	1 / 22	0	Greens/EFA
2014	Bart Staes	447,391	10.62 (#5)	6.69	1 / 21	0	Greens/EFA
2019	Petra De Sutter	525,908	12.37 (#5)	7.81	1 / 21	0	Greens/EFA
2024	Sara Matthieu	450,781	10.00 (#5)	6.31	1 / 21	0	Greens/EFA

== See also ==
- Ecolo the Walloon (Francophone) green party
- Green party
- Green politics
- List of environmental organizations
- European Green Party
- Global Greens
