= Wouter De Vriendt =

Belgian politician, and member of Groen!

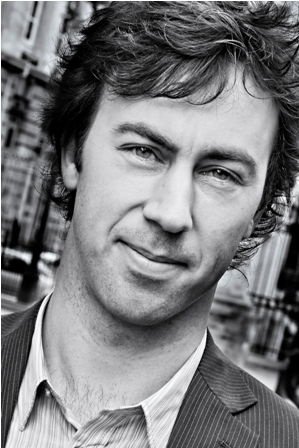

Member of the Ostend City Council
- Incumbent
- Assumed office 2 January 2007

Personal details
- Born: 22 June 1977 (age 49) Ostend, Belgium
- Party: Groen
- Education: University of Brussels (VUB)
- Occupation: Politician
- Website: wouterdevriendt.be

Wouter De Vriendt (born 22 June 1977 in Ostend) is a Belgian politician, and member of Groen.

== Biography ==
De Vriendt got a master's degree in Political science. After he finished his university studies, he did research on European politics, and international cooperation at the Free University of Brussels (VUB).

== Political career ==
On 10 June 2007 he was elected as representative in the Belgian federal parliament for the first time.

After being a Member of Parliament for 17 years, he announced his retirement from national politics in October 2023. He will not run in the 2024 Belgian federal election. He will remain active in local politics and run in the 2024 Belgian local elections in Oostende.

=== Timeline ===
- 10/06/2007 – : Representative (constituency of West Flanders)
