= Annelies Verlinden =

Belgian politician (born 1978)

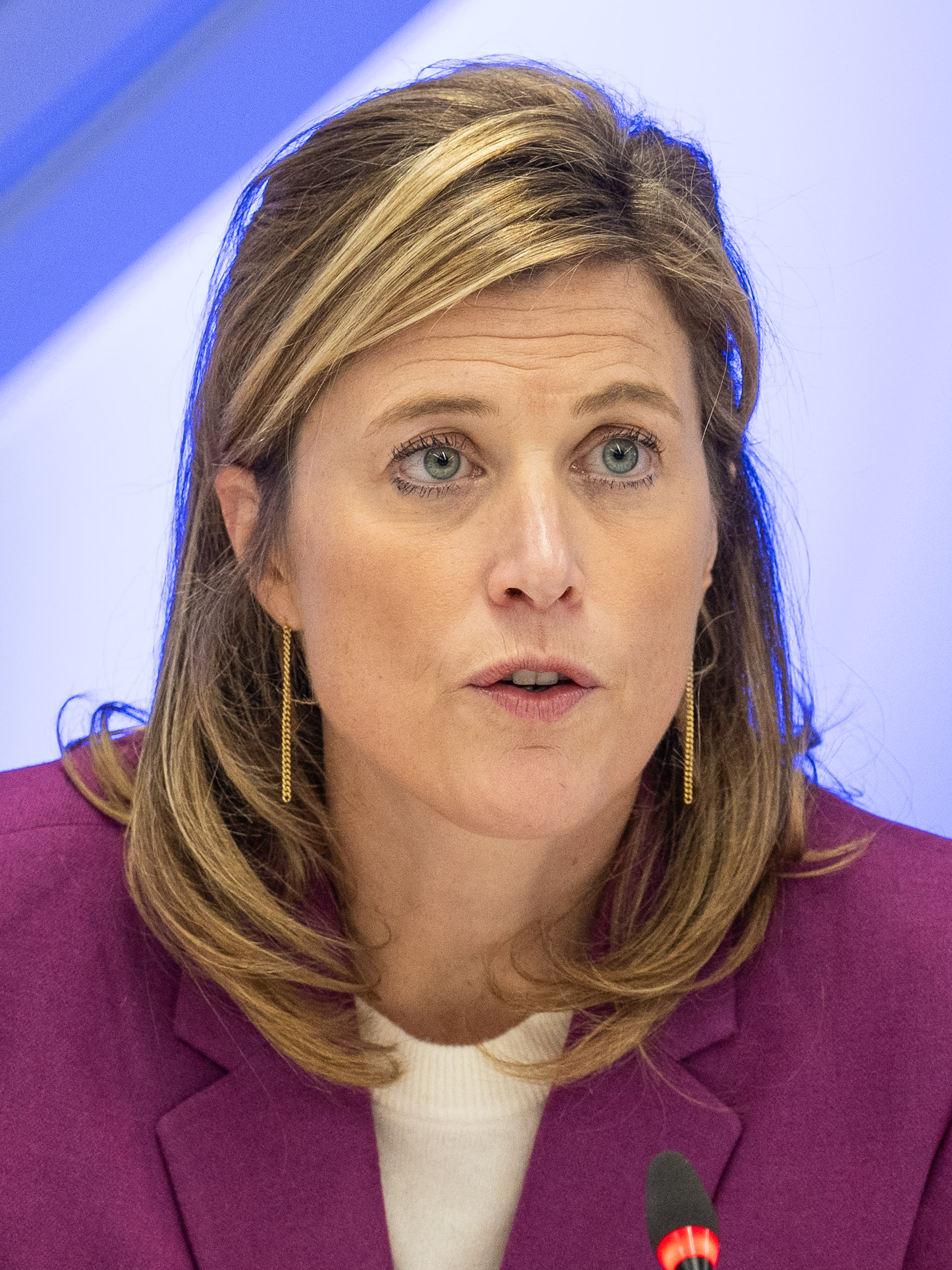
- Verlinden in 2024

Minister of Justice
- Incumbent
- Assumed office 3 February 2025
- Prime Minister: Bart De Wever
- Preceded by: Paul Van Tigchelt

Minister of the Interior
- In office 1 October 2020 – 3 February 2025
- Prime Minister: Alexander De Croo
- Preceded by: Pieter De Crem
- Succeeded by: Bernard Quintin

Member of the Schoten City Council
- In office 13 June 2003 – 14 October 2012

Personal details
- Born: Annelies Jan Louisa Verlinden; 5 September 1978 (age 48) Merksem, Belgium
- Party: CD&V
- Education: Saint Ignatius University Centre; KU Leuven; Université catholique de Louvain
- Occupation: Lawyer • Professor • Politician
- Awards: Order of Leopold (2024)

Annelies Jan Louisa Verlinden (born 5 September 1978) is a Belgian politician. As of 3 February 2025, she is the Minister of Justice in the De Wever Government led by Prime Minister Bart De Wever. Previously she was Minister of the Interior, Institutional Reforms, and Democratic Renewal in the De Croo Government. Verlinden is a member of the Christen-Democratisch en Vlaams party.

In the 2024 Belgian federal election, she was elected to the Belgian Chamber of Representatives.

In a 2023 interview, Verlinden reflected on Belgium’s institutional complexity, stating: *“Belgium is quite a complex country. We all know the Belgian painter René Magritte, with his absurd paintings and sometimes the comparison is made between these paintings and the state structure of Belgium.”*

Political offices
Preceded by Pieter De Crem	Minister of the Interior; 2020–2025	Succeeded by Bernard Quintin
Preceded by Paul Van Tigchelt	Minister of Justice; 2025–present	Incumbent
