= De Croo Government =

Government of Belgium from 2020-2025

- 98th Cabinet of Belgium
- Incumbent
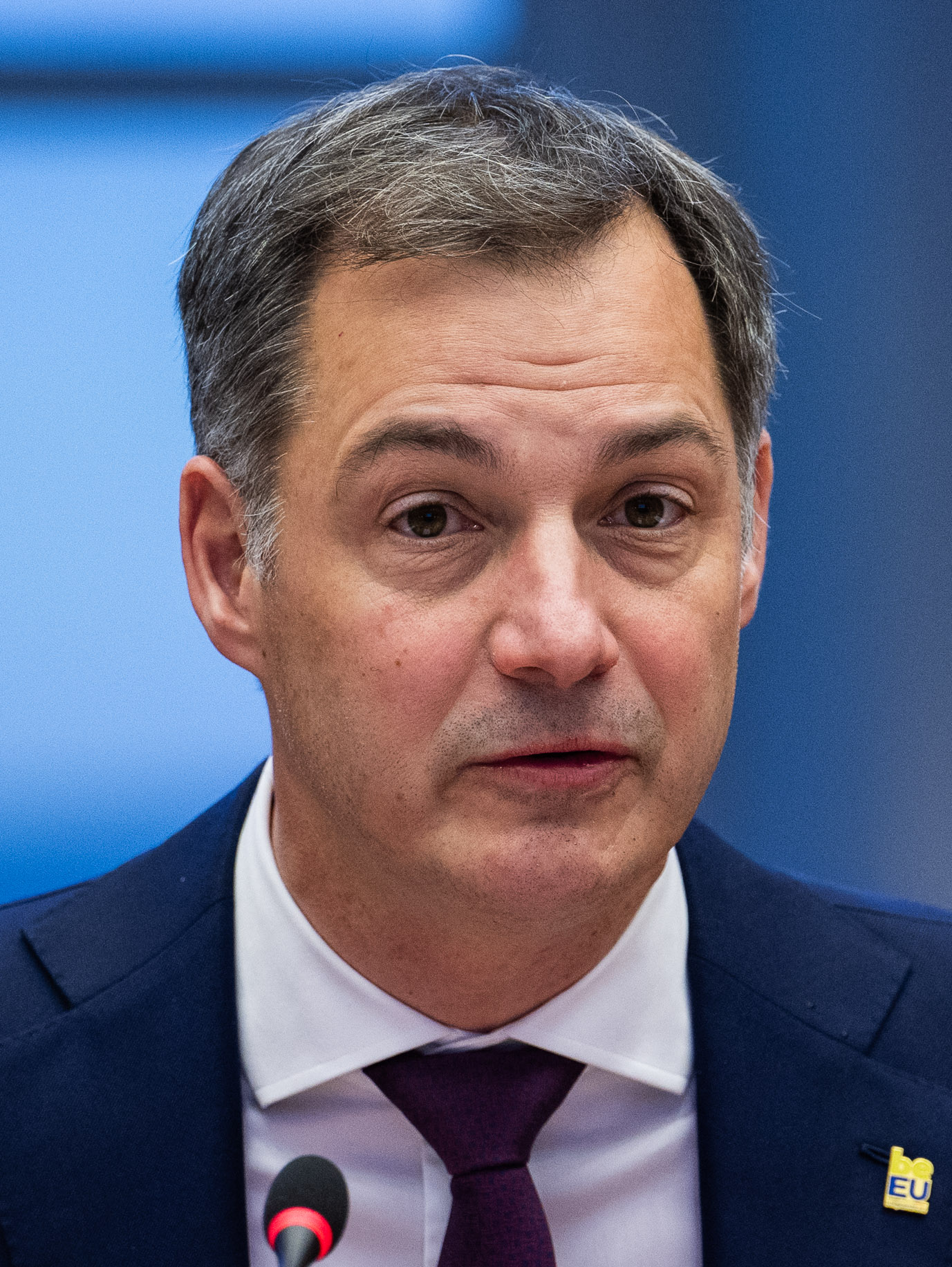
- Date formed: 1 October 2020
- Date dissolved: 3 February 2025

People and organisations
- Head of state: Philippe of Belgium
- Head of government: Alexander De Croo
- No. of ministers: 15
- Member parties: Open Vld (Flemish); MR (Francophone); Forward (Flemish); PS (Francophone); CD&V (Flemish); Ecolo (Francophone); Groen (Flemish)
- Status in legislature: Majority (coalition)
- Opposition parties: N-VA (Flemish); Vlaams Belang (Flemish); cdH (Francophone); DéFI (Francophone); PVDA-PTB

History
- Election: 2019 Belgian federal election
- Legislature term: 2019–2024
- Predecessor: Wilmès II
- Successor: De Wever

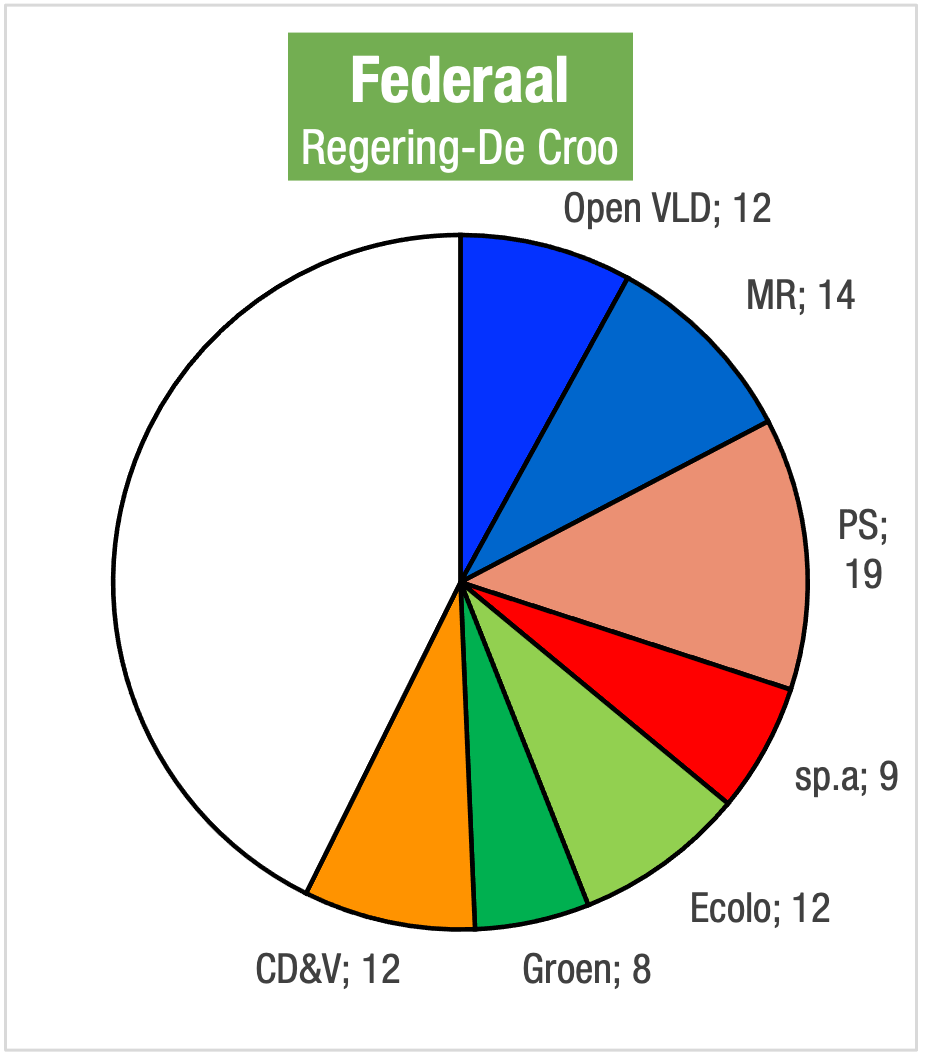
Distribution of seats in the Chamber of Representatives.

The De Croo Government was the Federal Government of Belgium, led by Prime Minister Alexander De Croo from 1 October 2020 to 3 February 2025. It functioned in a caretaker capacity from the resignation of Prime Minister Alexander De Croo on 10 June 2024 following the 2024 Belgian federal election, until the formation of the next government.

== History ==
The creation of the De Croo Government occurred on 1 October 2020, 494 days after the 2019 Belgian federal election of May 2019 as the 2019–20 Belgian government formation had been again a difficult process. The government replaced the minority Wilmès II Government, which was a temporary government instated to handle the consequences of the coronavirus outbreak. The De Croo Government was a so-called Vivaldi coalition, named after composer Antonio Vivaldi due to his work The Four Seasons which corresponds to the four different political views present in this coalition: the liberals (Open Vld and MR), the socialists (Vooruit and PS), the greens (Groen and Ecolo) and the Christian democrats of CD&V.

Most notably this government did not have a majority in the Flemish language group, as the two largest political parties in Flanders (and simultaneously in all of Belgium) were part of the opposition: N-VA and Vlaams Belang. Other opposition parties are the Francophone parties Les Engagés and DéFI and the nationwide PVDA-PTB.

Following the 2024 Belgian federal and regional elections, De Croo announced his resignation as prime minister.

== Composition ==
The Constitution requires an equal number of Dutch- and French-speaking ministers (regardless of the Prime Minister) and with all parties requiring some positions, the number of members in the Government has increased considerably, from 12 to 14 ministers with an additional 5 extra Secretaries of State for a total of 7 extra members in the Government compared to the previous Wilmès II Government.

With several new parties coming in to the government and many existing parties replacing their ministers, only three ministers remain which were already present in the Wilmès II Government: Prime Minister Alexander De Croo (who was Minister of Development Cooperation, Finance and fighting Fiscal Fraud), the previous Prime Minister Sophie Wilmès who now becomes Minister of Foreign Affairs and David Clarinval who moves from Minister of Budget, Civil Service, National Lottery and Scientific Policy to Minister of the Middle Class, SMEs, Self-employed, Agriculture, and Institutional Affairs. A large number of government members were relatively unknown at the time of their appointment, as several parties decided to opt for new faces instead of familiar ones. One notable returnee is Frank Vandenbroucke who, after a nine-year break from politics, returns to become Minister of Health and Social Affairs, and has held multiple positions in the period 1994–2009, including Ministers of Foreign Affairs, Social Affairs, Labor, and Pensions.

Cabinet members
| Portfolio | Minister | Took office | Left office | Party |
Prime Minister
| Prime Minister (from 22 April until 14 July 2022 also acting Minister of Foreign Affairs and European Affairs, replacing Sophie Wilmès) | Alexander De Croo | 1 October 2020 | 3 February 2025 | Open Vld |
Deputy Prime Ministers
| Minister of Economy and Employment | Pierre-Yves Dermagne | 1 October 2020 | 3 February 2025 | PS |
| Minister of Foreign Affairs, European Affairs, Foreign Trade and Federal Cultural Institutions (absent from 22 April until 14 July 2022, replaced by colleagues De Croo, Clarinval and Michel) | Sophie Wilmès | 1 October 2020 | 14 July 2022 | MR |
| Minister of the Small Businesses, Self-Employed, SMEs and Agriculture, Institutional Reforms and Democratic Renewal (from 22 April until 14 July 2022 also acting Minister of Foreign Trade and Deputy Prime Minister for the MR, replacing Sophie Wilmès) | David Clarinval | 22 April 2022 | 3 February 2025 | MR |
| Minister of Mobility | Georges Gilkinet | 1 October 2020 | 3 February 2025 | Ecolo |
| Minister of Finance, in charge of the Coordination of the Fight against Fraud | Vincent Van Peteghem | 1 October 2020 | 3 February 2025 | CD&V |
| Minister of Social Affairs and Public Health (from 19 October until 16 December 2022 also acting Minister of Development Cooperation and Urban Policy, replacing Meryame Kitir) | Frank Vandenbroucke | 1 October 2020 | Incumbent | Vooruit |
| Minister of Civil Service, Public Enterprises, Telecommunication and Postal Services | Petra De Sutter | 1 October 2020 | 3 February 2025 | Groen |
| Minister of Justice and the North Sea | Vincent Van Quickenborne | 1 October 2020 | 20 October 2023 | Open Vld |
| Minister of Justice and the North Sea | Paul Van Tigchelt | 22 October 2023 | 3 February 2025 | Open Vld |
Ministers
| Minister of the Small Businesses, Self-Employed, SMEs and Agriculture, Institutional Reforms and Democratic Renewal | David Clarinval | 1 October 2020 | 21 April 2022 | MR |
| Minister of Foreign Affairs, European Affairs, Foreign Trade and Federal Cultural Institutions | Hadja Lahbib | 15 July 2022 | 1 December 2024 | MR |
| Minister of Foreign Affairs, European Affairs, Foreign Trade and Federal Cultural Institutions | Bernard Quintin | 2 December 2024 | 3 February 2025 | MR |
| Minister of Pensions and Social Integration, in charge of Persons with Disabilities, Combating Poverty and Beliris | Karine Lalieux | 1 October 2020 | 3 February 2025 | PS |
| Minister of Defence | Ludivine Dedonder | 1 October 2020 | 3 February 2025 | PS |
| Minister of Climate, Environment, Sustainable Development and Green Deal | Zakia Khattabi | 1 October 2020 | 3 February 2025 | Ecolo |
| Minister of the Interior, Institutional Reforms and Democratic Renewal | Annelies Verlinden | 1 October 2020 | 3 February 2025 | CD&V |
| Minister of Development Cooperation and Urban Policy (absent from 19 October until 16 December 2022, replaced by colleague Vandenbroucke) | Meryame Kitir | 1 October 2020 | 16 December 2022 | Vooruit |
| Minister of Development Cooperation and Urban Policy | Caroline Gennez | 17 December 2022 | 1 October 2024 | Vooruit |
| Minister of Development Cooperation and Urban Policy | Frank Vandenbroucke | 1 October 2024 | 3 February 2025 | Vooruit |
| Minister of Energy | Tinne Van der Straeten | 1 October 2020 | 3 February 2025 | Groen |
Secretaries of State
| Secretary of State for Recovery and Strategic Investments, in charge of Science Policy; Deputy to the Minister of the Economy and Employment | Thomas Dermine | 1 October 2020 | 3 February 2025 | PS |
| Secretary of State for Digitization, in charge of Administrative Simplification, Privacy and Buildings Administration (from 22 April until 14 July 2022 also acting Secretary of State for Federal Cultural Institutions, replacing Sophie Wilmès); Deputy to the Prime Minister | Mathieu Michel | 1 October 2020 | 3 February 2025 | MR |
| Secretary of State for Gender Equality, Equal Opportunities and Diversity; Deputy to the Minister of Mobility | Sarah Schlitz | 1 October 2020 | 26 April 2023 | Ecolo |
| Secretary of State for Gender Equality, Equal Opportunities and Diversity; Deputy to the Minister of Mobility | Marie-Colline Leroy | 2 May 2023 | 3 February 2025 | Ecolo |
| Secretary of State for Asylum and Migration, in charge of the National Lottery; Deputy to the Minister of the Interior, Institutional Reforms and Democratic Renewal | Sammy Mahdi | 1 October 2020 | 27 June 2022 | CD&V |
| Secretary of State for Asylum and Migration, in charge of the National Lottery; Deputy to the Minister of the Interior, Institutional Reforms and Democratic Renewal | Nicole de Moor | 28 June 2022 | 3 February 2025 | CD&V |
| Secretary of State for Budget and Consumer Protection; Deputy to the Minister of Justice and the North Sea | Eva De Bleeker | 1 October 2020 | 18 November 2022 | Open Vld |
| Secretary of State for Budget and Consumer Protection; Deputy to the Minister of Justice and the North Sea | Alexia Bertrand | 18 November 2022 | 3 February 2025 | Open Vld |

=== Changes in composition ===
- On 21 April 2022, Sophie Wilmès took a temporary leave of absence for personal reasons. Officially she remains in office as both Minister and Deputy Prime Minister, however, in reality all her duties have been taken over by other members of the cabinet from 22 April 2022. Prime minister Alexander De Croo is the acting Minister of Foreign Affairs and Minister of European Affairs, David Clarinval took over her duties as Deputy Prime Minister and Minister of Foreign Trade, and finally Mathieu Michel took over the portfolio of Federal Cultural Institutions. On 14 July 2022 Wilmès resigned definitively as a member of the De Croo government, with all her portfolios allocated to newcomer Hadja Lahbib, although David Clarinval kept the position of Deputy Prime Minister for the MR.
- On 27 June 2022, Secretary of State for Asylum and Migration Sammy Mahdi was replaced by Nicole de Moor, as Mahdi had been elected the new party president of CD&V.
- After a first revision of the budget after errors and a new proposal containing different errors, Secretary of State for Budget Eva De Bleeker offered her resignation on 18 November 2022 and was immediately replaced by Alexia Bertrand. Bertrand is a member of the French speaking liberals of MR, but was invited to become a party member as well for the Flemish speaking liberals of Open Vld, allowing her to take up the position.
- Vooruit announced on 17 December 2022 that Minister of Development Cooperation and Urban Policy Meryame Kitir, who had been on sick leave already for nearly two months at that point, would not be returning and was officially replaced by Caroline Gennez.
- On 23 April 2023, Secretary of State for Gender Equality, Equal Opportunities and Diversity Sarah Schlitz resigned following a week of criticism mainly centered around the use of a personal logo in governmental projects (thus promoting herself with tax money which is forbidden), lying about having requested the logo to be used and on top of that one of her staff members compared the New Flemish Alliance with Nazism. Schlitz' party Ecolo appointed Marie-Colline Leroy as her successor and she was sworn in on 2 May 2023.
- Minister of Justice Vincent Van Quickenborne resigned on 20 October 2023, a few days after the 2023 Brussels shooting, as it turned out an error had been made as Tunisia had asked already in 2022 to transfer the perpetrator but the dossier had not been processed. Two days later, Open Vld appointed Paul Van Tigchelt to replace him causing former party president Gwendolyn Rutten to announce her immediate retirement from national politics.
- On 1 October 2024, Minister of Development Cooperation and Urban Policy Caroline Gennez resigned to become a minister in the Diependaele government. Frank Vandenbroucke, Deputy Prime Minister and also Minister of Social Affairs and Public Health, took over her responsibilities.
- On 1 December 2024, Minister of Foreign Affairs, European Affairs and Foreign Trade, and Federal Cultural Institutions Hadja Lahbib resigned to become European commissioner in the von der Leyen Commission II. Bernard Quintin succeeded her the next day.
