= Alexia Bertrand =

Belgian politician (born 1979)

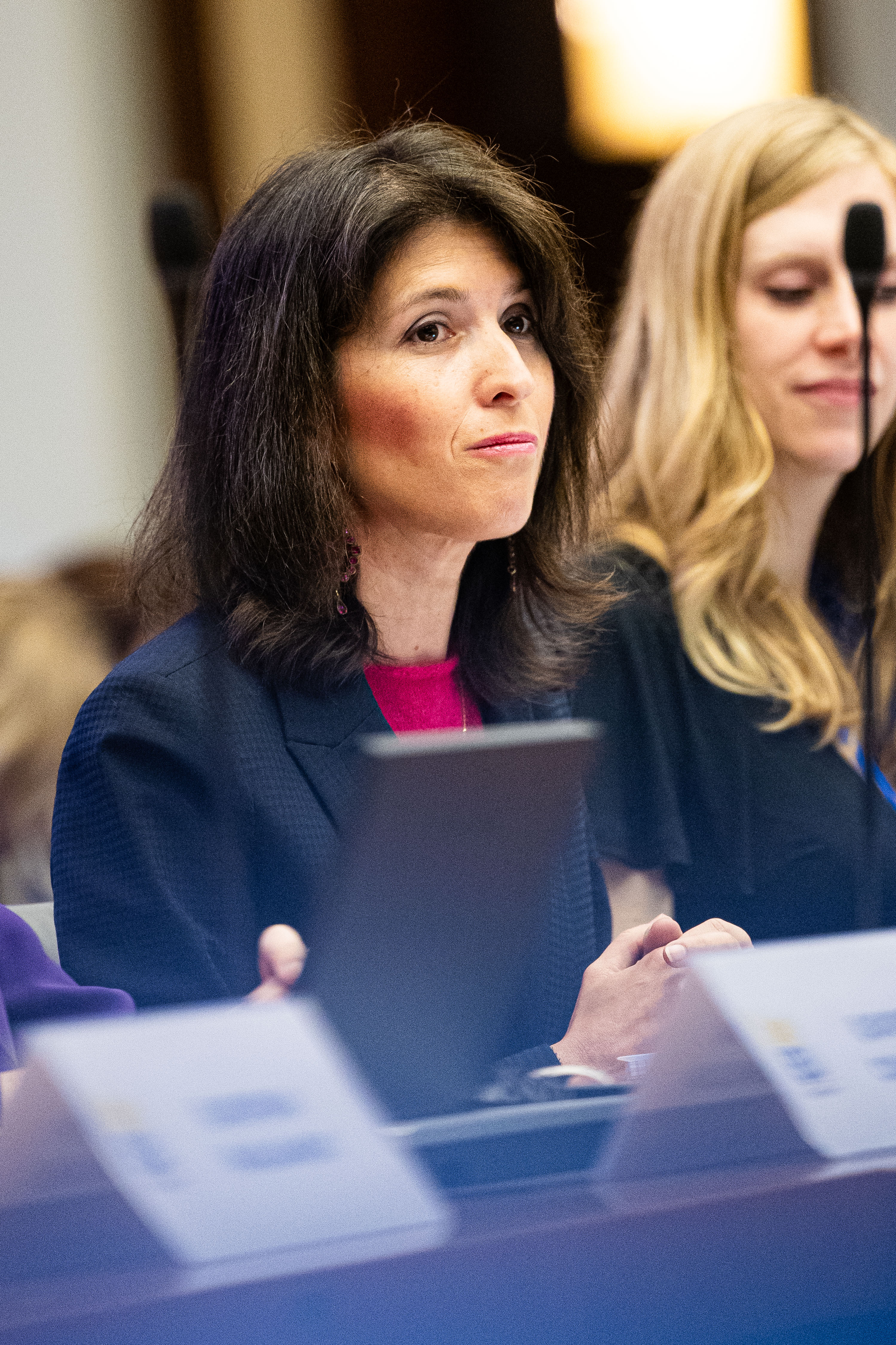

Member of the Chamber of Representatives
- Incumbent
- Assumed office 10 July 2024
- Constituency: Brussels

State Secretary for the Budget and Consumer Protection
- In office 18 November 2022 – 3 February 2025
- Prime Minister: Alexander De Croo
- Preceded by: Eva De Bleeker
- Succeeded by: Vincent Van Peteghem (as Minister of Budget); Rob Beenders (as Minister of Consumer Affairs)

Personal details
- Born: 30 March 1979 (age 47) Wilrijk, Antwerp, Belgium
- Party: MR; Anders (since 2022)
- Parent: Luc Bertrand (father)
- Education: Université Catholique de Louvain

Alexia Bertrand (born 30 March 1979) is a Belgian politician serving as a member of the Chamber of Representatives since 2024. Since 2025, she has served as group leader of Anders. She is the daughter of Luc Bertrand.

Bertrand was a member of the Parliament of the Brussels-Capital Region from 2019 to 2022, and served as group leader of the Reformist Movement. In 2022, she became a member of the Open Flemish Liberals and Democrats alongside her Reformist Movement membership. From 2022 to 2025, she served as state secretary for the budget and consumer protection.

She is a member of The Trilateral Commission.
