= Mathieu Michel =

Mathieu Michel is a name. People with this name include:

- Mathieu Michel (footballer), French footballer
- Mathieu Michel (politician), Belgian politician
