= 2021 hunger strike of undocumented migrants in Belgium =

The 2021 hunger strike of undocumented migrants in Belgium was a two-month-long hunger strike held by several hundred undocumented migrants in Belgium in protest of the policies of the Belgian government, led by Prime Minister Alexander De Croo and Secretary of State for Asylum and Migration Sammy Mahdi, concerning the COVID-19 pandemic and residency permits.

== Background ==
The Belgian authorities do not have a reliable estimate of the number of undocumented workers residing in Belgium. The estimates range from 50 000 to 250 000 people. The public administration's working assumption is that there are at least 100 000 undocumented migrants in Belgium, many of who work in industries such as restaurants, cleaning, and construction.

When the COVID-19 pandemic hit in early 2020, the Belgium government refused to implement policy changes to protect undocumented migrants, unlike several other European governments, such as temporarily extending unemployment benefits or offering temporary residencies. As a result, many undocumented migrants in the country were forced into extremely precarious situations and charities struggled to provide enough help.

== Hunger strike ==
Throughout the first few months of 2021, a number of protests was held by undocumented migrants concerning their situation. However, the Belgian government refused to implement any policy changes.

On May 23, 476 undocumented migrants began a hunger strike. They gathered at the church of Saint John the Baptist at the Béguinage and at the Université libre de Bruxelles, setting up mattresses with signs displaying each of their jobs and calling for the Belgian government to grant them temporary residency, support to alleviate the impact of the COVID-19 pandemic, and for the establishment of an independent body to oversee residency requests with clear criteria and in a timely manner. The Red Cross provided some medical support for the strikers.

In support of the strike, the We are Belgium too group was founded, launching a petition that gained tens of thousands of signatures. In mid-July, the Belgian artists at the Festival d'Avignon read an open letter of solidarity with the strike. The Democracy in Europe Movement 2025 also released an open letter in support of the strikers, with other 100 signatures from high-profile public figures, stating that "over the last 20 years, European states have collectively and drastically reduced the legal migration pathways to Europe."

Spokeswomen for the strikers, Cécile De Blick and Brenda Odimba, accused the Belgian state of having created an untenable situation in the first place. In successive reforms, the Belgian legislator chipped off the pathways available to undocumented workers living in Belgium and seeking a regularization of their status.

On 20 July 2021, two United Nations officials called for the Belgian government to grant temporary residence permits, with UN special rapporteur on human rights and extreme poverty Olivier De Schutter stating that "the information we have received is alarming and several of the hunger strikers are between life and death." Afterwards, two of the left-wing parties in the governing coalition in Belgium, the Socialist Party and Ecolo threatened to collapse the government if any of the strikers died. The left-wing Vooruit, however, stated that they backed the government's stance.

On 22 July 2021, following further talks with the government, the group ended their hunger strike after two months and the hunger strikers were taken to the hospital. Although it refused to implement any widespread policy changes, the government had promised that the hunger strikers would be able to go to a neutral zone and have their cases for residency evaluated individually. De Croo welcomed the end of the strike, stating that "a government can never accept blackmail."

== Alleged betrayal by State Secretary Sammy Mahdi ==
In November 2021, four representatives of the hunger strikers accused the Belgian Secretary of State of Asylum and Migration Sammy Mahdi of "unprecedented betrayal." The accusation came after the Belgian authorities rejected the requests for residence permits filed by hunger strikers. According to Alexis Deswaef, Marie-Pierre de Buisseret, Mehdi Kassou and Daniel Alliet (the priest at the Beguinage Church) who jointly represented the hunger strikers at the negotiations with the Belgian government in July 2022, the government representatives have made clear promises to accept the requests by the individual hunger strikes to obtain a residence permit in Belgium. The Belgian authorities subsequently rejected the files of hunger strikers that had been discussed in July and agreed in principle for regularisation.

All decisions on the grating of a residence permit to the hunger strikers were adopted within a year from the end of the strike. 90 people received a positive response out of 516 people for whom a demand has been introduced as a follow-up of the hunger strike. About 5 out of 6 applicants were rejected.
