= Nicole de Moor =

Belgian politician

Minister for Asylum and Migration
- In office 28 June 2022 – 3 February 2025
- Monarch: Philippe
- Prime Minister: Alexander De Croo
- Preceded by: Sammy Mahdi
- Succeeded by: Anneleen Van Bossuyt

Member of the Flemish Parliament
- Incumbent
- Assumed office 3 February 2025
- In office 9 June 2024 – 3 July 2024
- Constituency: East Flanders

Personal details
- Born: 18 January 1984 (age 42) Sint-Niklaas, Flanders, Belgium
- Party: CD&V
- Education: Ghent University; University of Amsterdam
- Occupation: politician

Nicole de Moor (born 1984) is a Belgian politician, a member of CD&V, a Flemish Christian-democratic political party. She served as the Secretary of State for Asylum and Migration in the government of Alexander De Croo between 28 June 2022 and 3 February 2025. In that position, she contributed to the European Migration and Asylum Pact during the Belgian Presidency of the Council of the European Union in 2024.

== Early life and career ==
De Moor studied law at Ghent University and the University of Amsterdam. From August 2008 to May 2009, she was a legal advisor at the Flemish Minorities Center and from May 2009 to November 2013, she was a researcher at Ghent University. In 2014, she obtained a PhD in law with a thesis on international migration due to environmental degradation. From November 2013 to November 2014, she worked as the Commissioner General for Refugees and Stateless Persons. She was a member of the board of directors of Enabel, the Belgian development agency. Since 2021, she has been a member of the board of directors of the Royal Flemish Theatre in Brussels. She is also a member of the United Nations Association Flanders Belgium.

De Moor is married and mother of two children.

== Political career ==
In November 2014, de Moor was a migration specialist in the cabinets of CD&V ministers Kris Peeters, Nathalie Muylle and Koen Geens, and in October 2020, she became head of cabinet to State Secretary for Asylum and Migration Sammy Mahdi.

At the end of June 2022, the party nominated de Moor as Minister for Asylum and Migration, Deputy to the Minister of the Interior, Institutional Reforms and Democratic Renewal, in the De Croo Government, to succeed Mahdi, who had become party chairman. On 28 June, she took the oath before the king.

=== Minister for Asylum and Migration ===
During her mandate, de Moor pushed for the reform of Belgian migration policy, proposing a "controlled migration code" and measures for closer follow-up of people who have to return to their country of origin. However, during her term of office, Nicole de Moor was criticised for her handling of the reception crisis in Belgium. On 29 August 2023, she announced that the Federal Agency for the Reception of Asylum Seekers (Fedasil) would no longer accept single men seeking asylum in Belgium. On 13 September 2023, this measure was suspended by the Council of State for violating the right to reception granted to all asylum seekers by the law of 12 January 2007. Despite this suspension, Nicole de Moor maintained her policy. In total, since 2022, Belgium has been condemned 16,669 times for its failures in receiving asylum seekers. Nicole de Moor has openly refused to pay the penalties due as a result of these convictions.

At the European level, Nicole de Moor showed her support for closer European cooperation on migration and collaborated on an agreement on a European Migration Pact, which was adopted during the Belgian EU Presidency.

=== Controversial candidacy for United Nations High Commissioner for Refugees ===
In May 2025, it was officially confirmed that Nicole de Moor, is running for the post of United Nations High Commissioner for Refugees. She has the support of her party and within the European People's Party (EPP), as well as the Belgian federal government led by Prime Minister Bart De Wever. On 10 September 2025, 17 associations and more than 200 lawyers signed a letter of non-recommendation to the Secretary-General of the United Nations to disapprove of her candidacy. In particular, they stress that during her tenure as Secretary of State for Asylum and Migration, Nicole de Moor has consistently violated the human rights of migrants who have come to take refuge in Belgium.
