= Paul Van Tigchelt =

Belgian politician (born 1973)

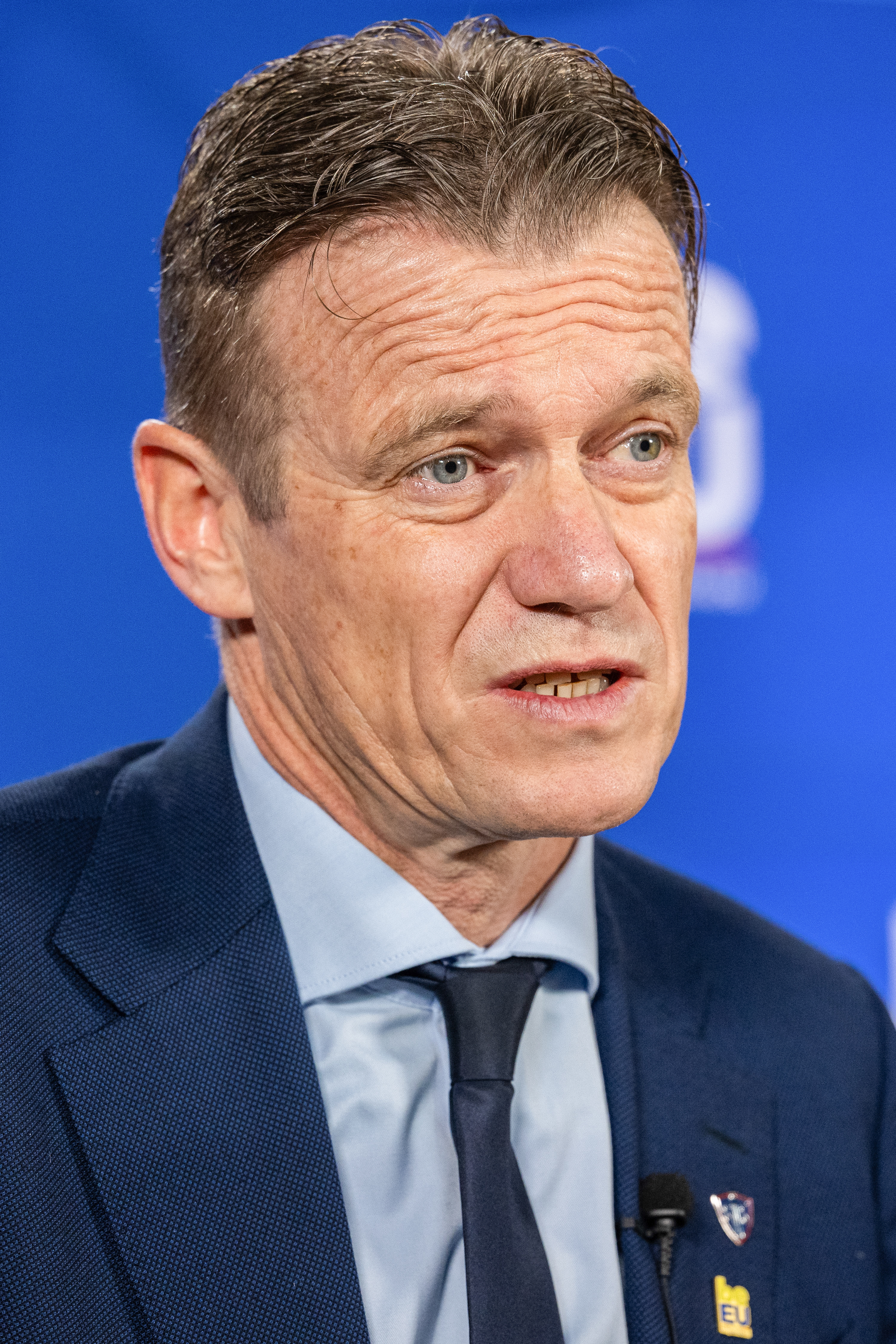
- Van Tigchelt in 2024

Deputy Prime Minister of Belgium
- In office 22 October 2023 – 3 February 2025
- Prime Minister: Alexander De Croo
- Preceded by: Vincent Van Quickenborne

Minister of Justice and the North Sea
- In office 22 October 2023 – 3 February 2025
- Prime Minister: Alexander De Croo
- Preceded by: Vincent Van Quickenborne
- Succeeded by: Annelies Verlinden

Personal details
- Born: November 13, 1973 (age 52) Weelde, Antwerp, Belgium
- Party: Open VLD
- Children: 1
- Education: Catholic University of Leuven

Paul Van Tigchelt (born 13 November 1973) is a Belgian politician from Open VLD who served as the Federal Minister of Justice and the North Sea in the government of Prime Minister Alexander De Croo from 22 October 2023 to 3 February 2025.

== Early life ==
Van Tigchelt was born on 13 November 1973 in Weelde, Antwerp, Belgium, where his parents owned a bakery. He studied law at the Catholic University of Leuven and started working as a Prosecutor in Antwerp in 1998 before serving as assistant public prosecutor in 2003. Van Tigchelt is married and has a son.

== Career ==
Van Tigchelt's first experience in national politics was as an advisor and later deputy Chef de Cabinet and spokesperson for (former) Open VLD Minister of the Interior Patrick Dewael from 2003 to 2008. After this, Van Tigchelt returned to practicing law and served as assistant public prosecutor with the Tribunal of first instance in Antwerp from 2010 to 2014. In 2014, Van Tigchelt became assistant Public prosecutor general at the Antwerp public prosecutor's office where he took a strong stance against the drug gangs amongst other. Van Tigchelt served as director of anti terror organization OCAD from January 2016 to October 2020. When the De Croo Government was formed in October 2020, Van Tigchelt returned to national politics, this time as the deputy Chef de Cabinet for Minister of Justice Vincent Van Quickenborne. Following Van Quickenborne's resignation on 20 October 2023, Van Tigchelt was appointed on 22 October 2023 by Prime Minister Alexander De Croo as Van Quickenborne's successor.

Van Tigchelt was succeeded as Minister of Justice by Annelies Verlinden on 3 February 2025, following the inauguration of the De Wever government. During the 2024 Belgian federal election, Van Tigchelt was the leading candidate for the Open Vld list in Antwerp and was elected to the Chamber of Representatives. In October of that same year during the 2024 Belgian local elections, Van Tigchelt was the leading candidate for the Open Vld list in his hometown of Zoersel and was elected as a member of the Zoersel City Council.
