= Sarah Schlitz =

Belgian politician (born 1986)

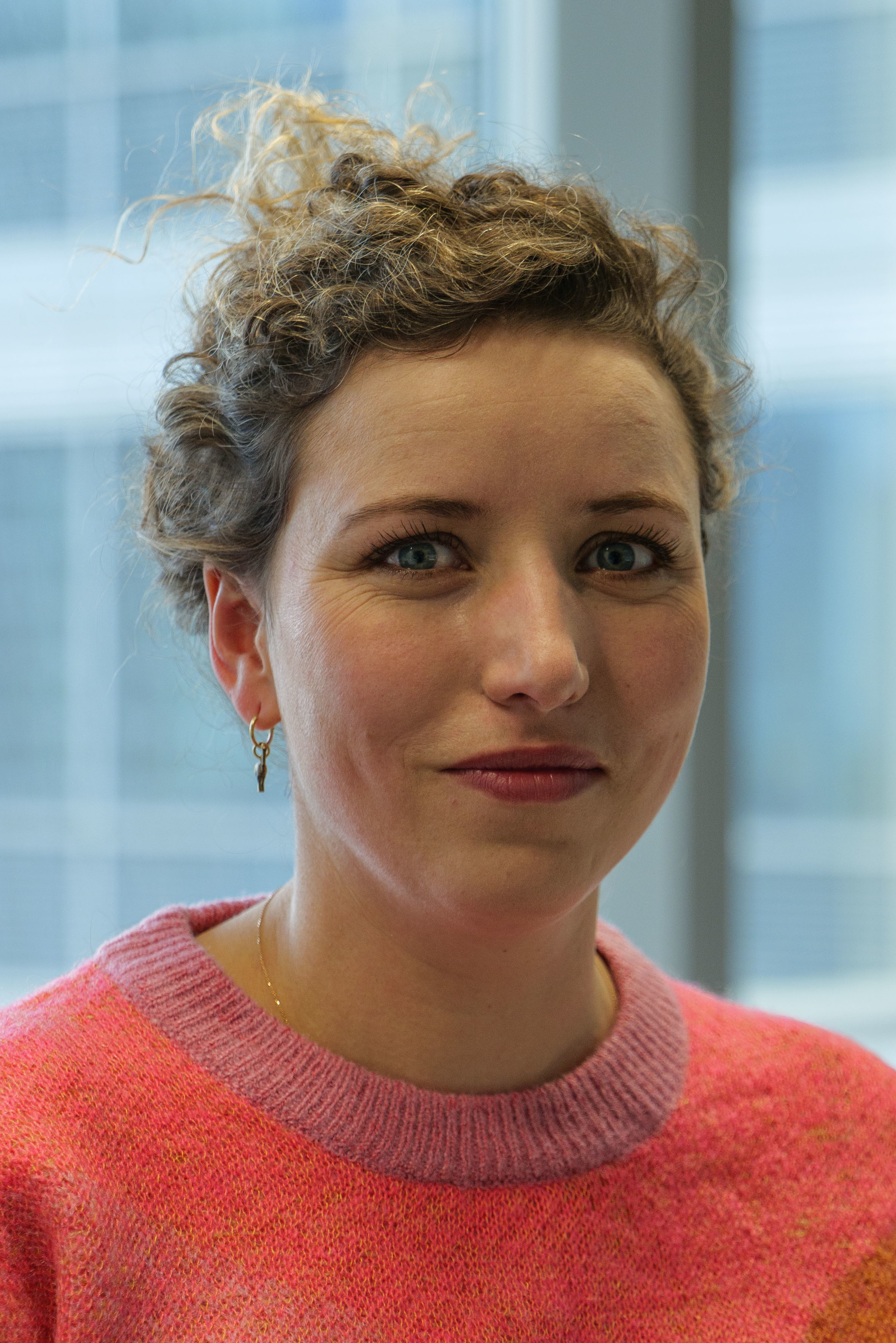
- Sarah in 2020

Secretary of State for Gender Equality, Equal Opportunities and Diversity
- In office 1 October 2020 – 26 April 2023
- Monarch: Philippe
- Prime Minister: Alexander De Croo
- Succeeded by: Marie-Colline Leroy

Member of the Chamber of Representatives
- In office October 2018 – October 2020

Personal details
- Born: 7 December 1986 (age 39) Liège, Belgium
- Party: Ecolo
- Education: University of Liège
- Occupation: Politician

Sarah Schlitz (born 7 December 1986) is a Belgian politician from Ecolo. She was Belgian Secretary of State for Gender Equality, Equal Opportunity and Diversity in the government of the prime minister Alexander De Croo.

== Early life and education ==
Sarah Schlitz was born in Liège to a family with a political background and is the granddaughter of the former mayor of Liège, Henri Schlitz. She studied at the University of Liège and graduated with a Master of Science in Political Science, and supplementary masters in Urban Studies and Spatial Development.

== Political career ==
In Liège, Sarah Schlitz has been involved in grassroots community organizing focusing on ecological, social and feminist politics. She chose to join Ecolo, rather than the Socialist Party of which her grandfather was a member. Between 2015 and 2018, she was campaign coordinator at the ecological association Inter-Environnement Wallonie, and from 2016 to 2018 she was co-chair of the Coalition Climat.

In October 2012, she was elected to the city council of Liège as part of Ecolo. In October 2018, she was reelected as a member of the citizen's movement Vert Ardent. She resigned from the city council in September 2019 in order to focus on her work as a member of the federal Parliament.

In the 2014 general election, she came second with 2.935 votes as a substitute candidate for Ecolo in the Liege constituency. In October 2018, she succeeded Muriel Gerkens, who resigned from parliament.

In the 2019 parliamentary election, she was elected to the Belgian Federal Parliament with 17.728 votes as Ecolo's chief candidate for the constituency of Liège.

From 1 October 2020 to 26 April 2023, she was the State Secretary for Gender Equality, Equal Opportunities and Diversity in the De Croo government.

She resigned from her position as state secretary due to use of personal logo in governmental projects.

== Controversies ==
In 2021, Schlitz was criticized for choosing Ihsane Haouach to be the government commissioner at the Institute for the Equality of Women and Men, Partner in the coalition Reformist Movement said that Haouach's hijab went against the government's neutrality. Haouach resigned after learning that State Security had connected her to the Muslim Brotherhood. In late 2021, Schlitz used her personal logo in official communication, which is not permitted, and she was questioned harshly about it in parliament.

In April 2023 she became the centre of a scandal when it was made known that her personal logo had been added to projects that had been funded by her as state secretary, which is illegal in Belgium. She claimed that she had not asked for this and that the projects had acted on their own initiative, but leaked emails later showed that she had explicitly requested this herself, after which the opposition called for her resignation. To make matters worse, her cabinet employee shared a message on social media that linked nationalist party N-VA to Nazism.

Two days later, she resigned to prevent a debate in the chamber of representatives. She was replaced by Marie-Colline Leroy.
