= Brenda Odimba =

Belgian activist

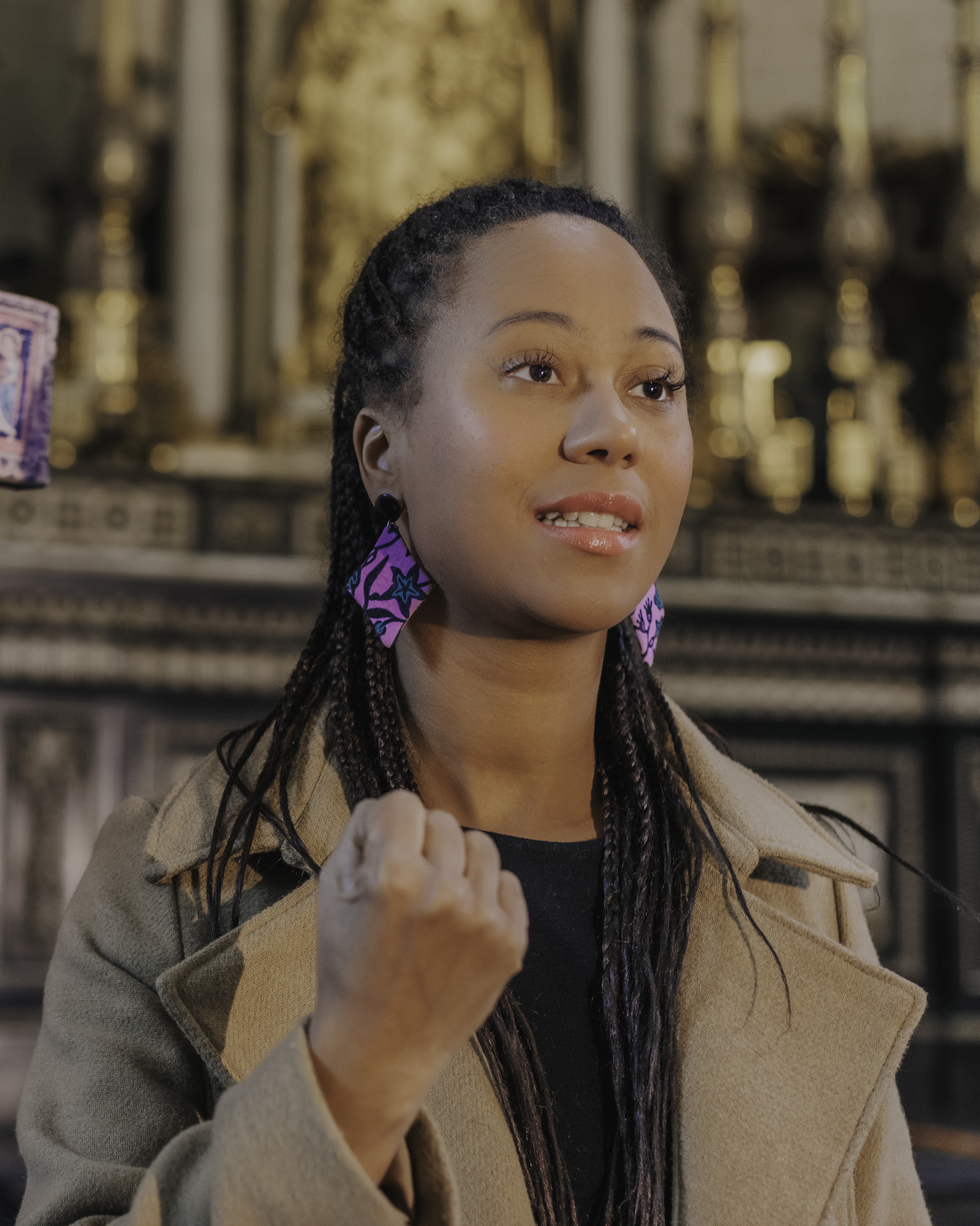
- Brenda Odimba at the Beguinage church
- Born: 1989 (age 36–37); Brussels, Belgium
- Education: Master degree in Chemical Engineering (Université libre de Bruxelles, 2012) Master in Management (Vrije Universiteit Brussel, 2020)
- Occupations: Decolonial; Activist

Brenda Odimba is an engineer and decolonial activist. Odimba is Belgian of Congolese descent. Her focus is grassroots activism in the Democratic Republic of the Congo. Odimba founded the association Mwasi asbl.

== Early life ==
Odimba was born is Brussels in 1989. Her father is Belgian and her mother was born in Congo. Her mother lived in Belgium as an undocumented worker for a number of years. Odimba studied at Université libre de Bruxelles and Vrije Universiteit Brussel. She is a trained chemical engineer.

== Decolonial activist ==
=== Anti-racism ===
Odimba is a decolonial activist. She helped organize the George Floyd protests in Belgium in 2020 and was part of the Black Lives Matter movement, spelling her name as Branda Audimba.

In April 2023, Odimba helped draw attention to a police shooting of a psychiatric patient in Brussels, at Fond’Roy Clinic. The clinic called the police on its patient after the patient became agitated. A collective of health professionals alleged that the skin colour of the patient was a deciding factor in the way the police handled the situation, resulting in the death of the patient, a black man, while Odimba highlighted the fact that this incident of police violence was a result of the intersectionality of racism and ableism.

=== Peace activist ===
In December 2025, Odimba, as a representative of the initiative Free Congo, expressed objections to the 2025 Democratic Republic of the Congo–Rwanda peace agreement, brokered by Qatar and the United States. She participated in the protest in Brussels by the Belgian-Congolese community against the agreement. According to Odimba the agreement is a continuation of the exploitation of mineral resources of Congo by the imperialist forces, without regard for the lives and well-being of the Congolese population.

== Human rights ==
Odimba was one of the activists supporting the spokespeople of the 2021 hunger strike of undocumented migrants in Belgium. Odimba acted in support of the 2021 hunger strike of undocumented migrants in Belgium, which took place at the Béguinage Church in Brussels. Odimba called on the Belgian government to align its legislation on undocumented migrants with the rules of the Universal Declaration of Human Rights of the United Nations. After the hunger strike had been brought to an end, Odimba denounced the rhetoric of Sammy Mahdi, the Belgian State Secretary for Asylum and Migration at the time, as manipulative leading to a division in the undocumented population between those who took part in the strike and those who didn’t.

== Climate justice ==
Odimba is also an environmental activist. In 2021, she was one of the thousands of plaintiffs who took the Belgian public authorities to court over their failing to take action to meet the international climate targets. Odimba also wrote and protested against EACOP, a mega project in Africa by Total Énergies (oil industry). In April 2022, Odimba participated in a protest against TotalEnergies in Antwerpen, as expert on oil and gas with Greenpeace Belgium. The protest was calling out the French oil and gas company for its continued dealings with Russia after 2022 Russian invasion of Ukraine.
