= Marie-Colline Leroy =

Belgian politician (born 1984)

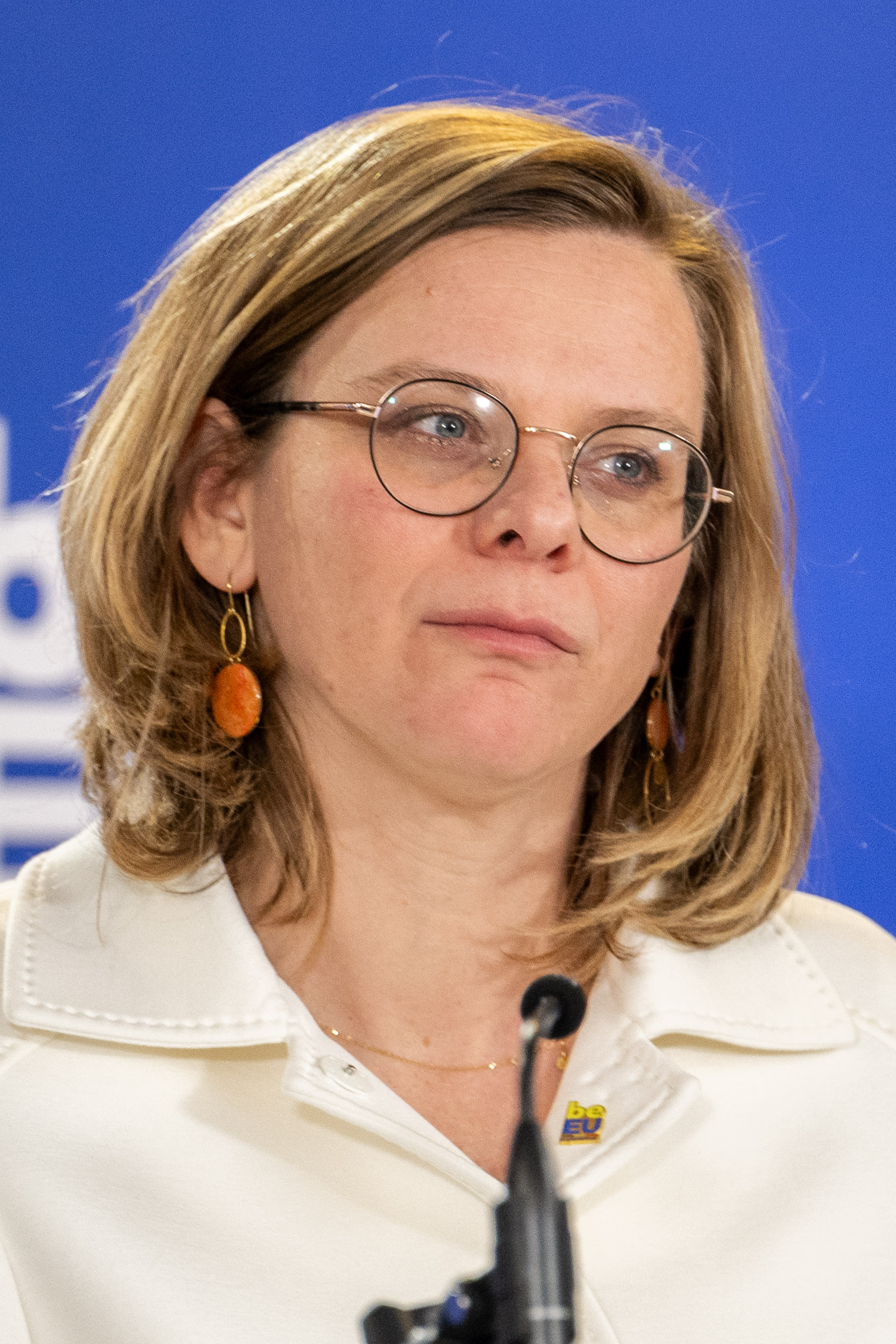
- Leroy in 2024

Secretary of State for Gender Equality, Equal Opportunities and Diversity
- In office 2 May 2023 – 3 February 2025
- Monarch: Philippe
- Prime Minister: Alexander De Croo
- Preceded by: Sarah Schlitz
- Succeeded by: Rob Beenders

Member of the Chamber of Representatives
- In office 20 June 2019 – 11 May 2023
- Succeeded by: Louis Mariage
- Constituency: Hainaut

Personal details
- Born: 1 July 1984 (age 42) Baudour, Saint-Ghislain, Belgium
- Party: Ecolo
- Education: Université libre de Bruxelles
- Occupation: Politician

Marie-Colline Leroy (born 1 July 1984) is a Belgian politician from Ecolo. She served as the Secretary of State for Gender Equality, Equal Opportunities and Diversity and Deputy to the Minister of Mobility in the De Croo Government from 2 May 2023 until 3 February 2025.

== Early life and education ==
Leroy was born on 1 July 1984 in Baudour. Her father, Jacky Leroy, was the former Director General of Education of the French Community at the French Community and worked in various cabinets while her mother is a Dutch teacher. She has one brother, Baptiste Leroy, who is a municipal councillor in Leuze-en-Hainaut.

She studied Romance languages at the Université libre de Bruxelles (ULB). She then started teaching at the school Athénée Royal de Braine-le-Comt from September 2007 to June 2008. Since September 2008 she has been a lecturer at Haute Ecole en Hainaut, as she was awarded her certification to teach in upper secondary education at ULB.

== Political career ==
She joined Ecolo in 2009 at the Brussels brunch, but later on moved to Frasnes-lez-Anvaing where she registered at. From 2015 to 2017 she was co-president of Ecolo Picardy. By October 2018 she was head of Ecolo's list in Frasnes-lez-Anvaing. She was later elected as a municipal councillor for the municipality.

In May 2019 she was elected to the Chamber of Representatives. Upon entering the Chamber of Representatives, she primarily became concerned with supportive measures during the COVID pandemic, such as temporary unemployment and bridging rights. She was also concerned with bringing equal opportunities in employment as a self-identified feminist. She left office on 11 May 2023.

== See also ==
- List of members of the Chamber of Representatives of Belgium, 2019–2024
