= Sammy Mahdi =

Belgian politician (born 1988)

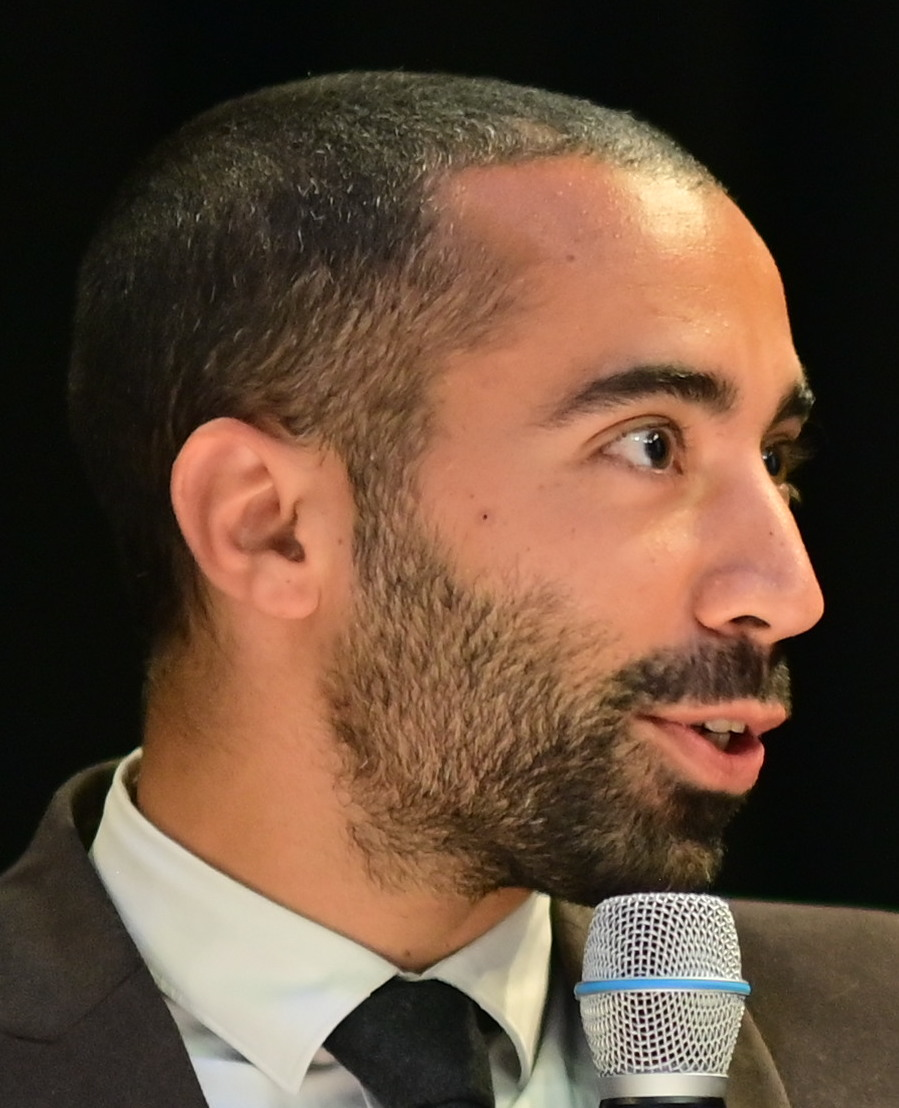
- Mahdi in 2022

Secretary of State for Asylum and Migration
- In office 1 October 2020 – 27 June 2022
- Monarch: Philippe
- Prime Minister: Alexander De Croo
- Preceded by: Maggie De Block
- Succeeded by: Nicole de Moor

Member of the Chamber of Representatives
- Incumbent
- Assumed office 10 July 2024
- Constituency: Flemish Brabant
- In office 17 March 2020 – 1 October 2020
- Constituency: Flemish Brabant

Personal details
- Born: 21 September 1988 (age 38) Ixelles, Brussels, Belgium
- Party: CD&V
- Education: Vrije Universiteit Brussel
- Occupation: Politician

Sammy Mahdi (Note: [ˈsɑmɪ ˈmeːdɪ]) (born 21 September 1988) is a Belgian Christian-Democrat politician, a member and the president of CD&V, who in March 2020 became a member of the Belgian Chamber of Representatives.

On 1 October 2020, Mahdi became Secretary of State for Asylum and Migration in the new government led by Alexander De Croo. In June 2022, he became the president of the CD&V party.

== Life ==
Mahdi was born in Ixelles (Brussels) to an Iraqi refugee father and a Flemish mother. He studied political science at the Vrije Universiteit Brussel and obtained a master's degree in international and European law. From 2014 to 2017, he was a parliamentary assistant to Flemish Member of Parliament Joris Poschet. Since 2016 he is also a regular columnist for the newspaper De Morgen.

After being a board member of Jong CD&V since 2015, in 2017 Mahdi became the chair of the youth section of CD&V, re-elected in 2019.

From 2015 to 2017, Mahdi was chairman of the CD&V section of Sint-Jans-Molenbeek. In the last year, Mahdi moved to Vilvoorde, where he became a board member of the local CD&V section. Since January 2019 he is also a municipal councilor of Vilvoorde and chairman of the CD&V faction in the city council.

In October 2019 he ran to succeed Wouter Beke as party leader, in what became a close race with Joachim Coens, who in the final round won due to greater support in West Flanders and among elderly party members.

After several years involved in party organisation and in local politics, Mahdi was elected a reserve member of the Chamber of Representatives for the constituency of Flemish Brabant in the 2019 Belgian federal election, and in March 2020 took his seat in the chamber when Koen Geens became a member of the Wilmès II Government. As a result, he also resigned as chairman of Jong CD&V.

On 1 October 2020, Mahdi became Secretary of State for Asylum and Migration in the cabinet of Alexander De Croo. He said in statements to local media that he intends to increase the deportations of asylum seekers who did not have the right to stay in Belgium. After the outbreak of the 2021 Taliban offensive, a few days before the establishment of the Islamic Emirate of Afghanistan, he refused to impose a moratorium on Belgium deportation practices to Afghanistan, despite calls from the Afghan government, the European Union and Amnesty International to stop those extraditions on the ground of degrading humanitarian situation.

In November 2021, four representatives of the hunger strikers of the Béguinage Church accused Mahdi of "unprecedented betrayal." The accusation came after the Belgian authorities rejected the requests for residence permits filed by hunger strikers. The strikers had halted their two-months long hunger strike in July 2021 after representatives of Mahdi promised them that their individual files will be accepted for regularization. Mahdi defended himself against the accusation by referring to his past objections to group amnesties for undocumented workers.

In May 2022, following an early election due to a significant drop in the party's standing in the polls, he ran again for the presidency of the CD&V. He was then the only candidate. In June 2022, with 97%, he became president of the party.

In September 2023, he competed on Belgium Drag Queen TV show Make Up Your Mind (Belgium) Season 1, which he came first.

In the 2024 Belgian federal election, he was elected to the Belgian Chamber of Representatives.
