= Anneleen Van Bossuyt =

Belgian politician (born 1980)

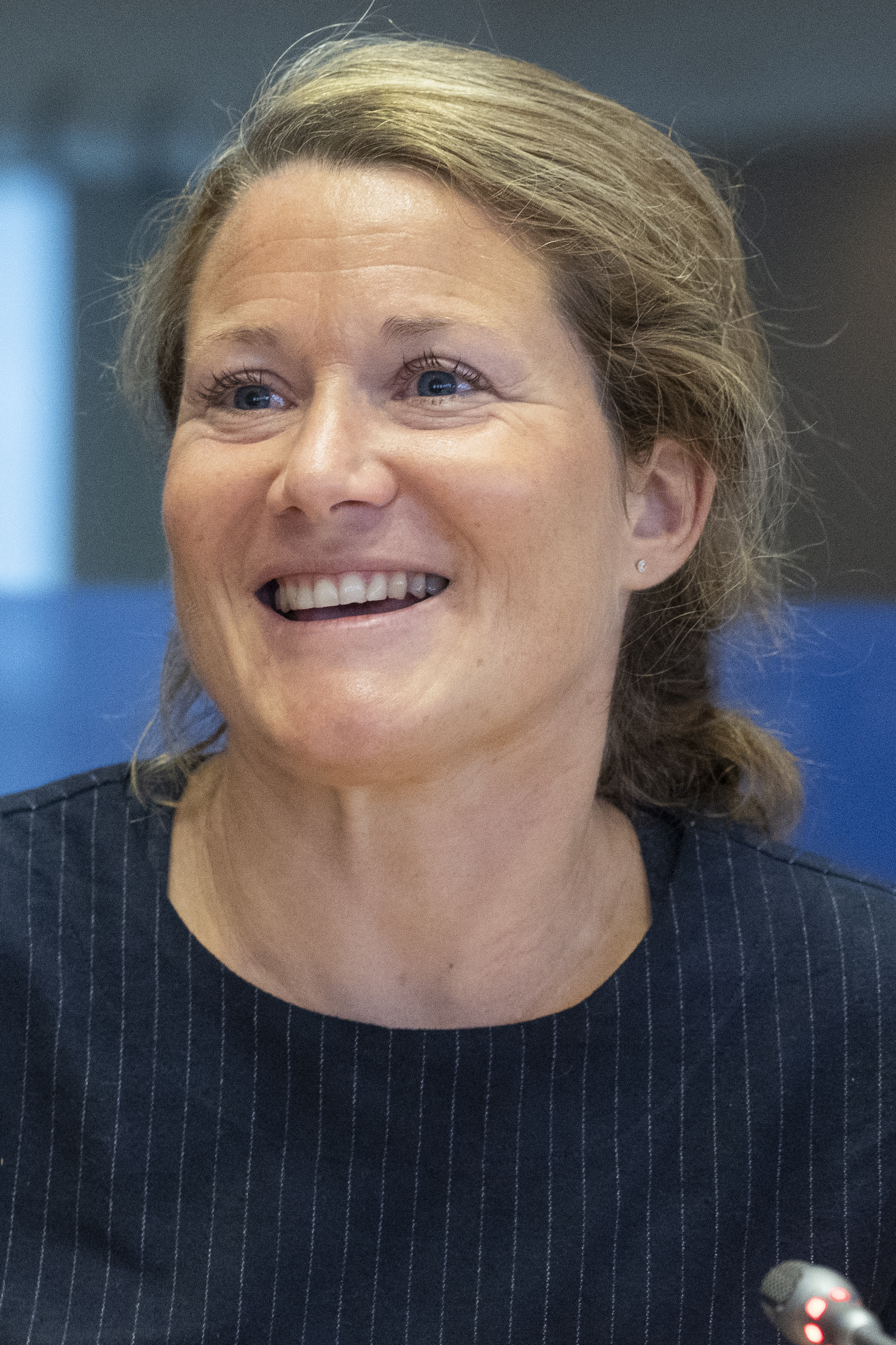
- Van Bossuyt in 2022

Minister of Asylum, Migration, Integration and Urban policy
- Incumbent
- Assumed office 3 February 2025
- Prime Minister: Bart De Wever
- Preceded by: Nicole de Moor (as Secretary of State for Asylum and Migration); Frank Vandenbroucke (as Acting Minister of Urban policy)

Member of the Chamber of Representatives
- Incumbent
- Assumed office 20 June 2019
- Constituency: East Flanders

Member of the European Parliament for Belgium
- In office 8 January 2015 – 1 July 2019
- Preceded by: Louis Ide
- Constituency: Dutch-speaking electoral college

Personal details
- Born: 10 January 1980 (age 46) Ghent, Belgium
- Party: New Flemish Alliance
- Education: Ghent University; University of Rennes 1
- Occupation: Lawyer • Politician
- Website: www.anneleenvanbossuyt.be

Anneleen Van Bossuyt (born 10 January 1980) is a Flemish politician who has been serving as the Minister of Asylum, Migration, Integration and Urban policy in the De Wever government since February 2025. She previously was a Member of the European Parliament (MEP) from January 2015 to July 2019 for the New Flemish Alliance (N-VA), part of the European Conservatives and Reformists group. She succeeded Louis Ide. Since 2019, she has served as an MP in the Belgian Chamber of Representatives.

== Biography ==
Van Bossuyt grew up in Ghent. She obtained a bachelor's degree in law from the University of Ghent in 2003 and then completed her studies with a master's in European law at the University of Rennes in 2004. After her studies in France, she returned to the University of Ghent as a lecturer in law before working for the N-VA's parliamentary faction as an advisor on legal policy.

She was a member of the Committee on the Internal Market and Consumer Protection (IMCO), of which she was the chair from June 2017 to the end of the term. She also was a member of the delegation for relations with the United States.

Van Bossuyt was N-VA's main candidate in the Ghent municipal elections of October 2018 and is since a member of the Ghent City Council. She was also N-VA's main candidate in the federal elections of 2019 where she ran on the list for East Flanders, and since holds a seat in the Chamber of Representatives.
