= Vincent Van Peteghem =

Belgian politician (born 1980)

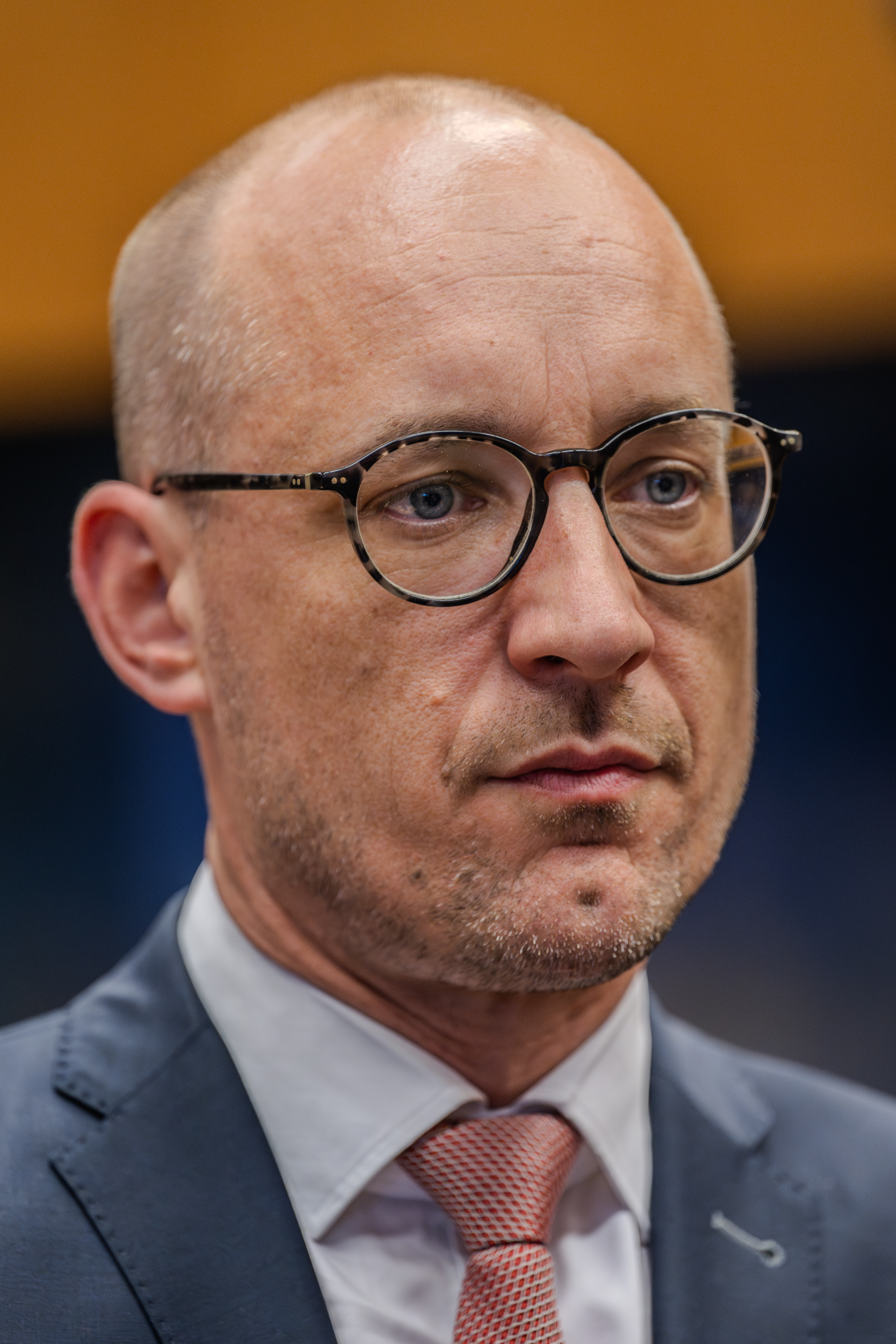
- Van Peteghem in 2024

Deputy Prime Minister of Belgium
- Incumbent
- Assumed office 1 October 2020
- Prime Minister: Alexander De Croo; Bart De Wever

Minister of Budget and Administrative Simplification
- Incumbent
- Assumed office 3 February 2025
- Prime Minister: Bart De Wever
- Preceded by: Alexia Bertrand (as Minister of Budget); Mathieu Michel (as Secretary of State for Administrative Simplification)

Minister of Finance
- In office 1 October 2020 – 3 February 2025
- Prime Minister: Alexander De Croo
- Preceded by: Alexander De Croo
- Succeeded by: Jan Jambon

Member of the Chamber of Representatives
- In office 10 July 2024 – 3 February 2025
- Constituency: East Flanders
- In office 25 May 2014 – 26 May 2019
- Constituency: East Flanders

Mayor of Nazareth-De Pinte
- Incumbent
- Assumed office 1 January 2019
- Preceded by: Hilde Claeys

Personal details
- Born: 28 October 1980 (age 45) Ghent, Belgium
- Party: CD&V
- Education: Ghent University
- Occupation: Professor • Politician
- Website: Official website

Vincent Van Peteghem (28 October 1980) is a Belgian economist and politician of CD&V who has been serving as a Deputy Prime Minister and as the Minister of Budget in the De Wever Government since february 2025. He previously served as the Minister of Finance in the De Croo government from 1 October 2020 to 3 February 2025. He was a member of the Chamber of Representatives of Belgium from 2014 until 2020.

== Early life and career ==
Vincent Van Peteghem was born on 28 October 1980 in Ghent. He was a management professor at the EDHEC Business School in Lille, France.

== Political career ==
In the 2014 elections, Van Peteghem was first elected to the Chamber of Representatives for CD&V, and served until 2019. On 1 January 2019 he became mayor of De Pinte. In 2019, he was a candidate as Chairman of the CD&V, but finished in fourth place.

On 1 October 2020, Van Peteghem became Deputy Prime Minister and Minister of Finance in the cabinet of Alexander De Croo.

In 2023, as chair of the European Investment Bank's Board of Governors, Van Peteghem was in charge of leading the process of selecting a new president for the organization.

In the 2024 Belgian federal election, he was elected to the Belgian Chamber of Representatives.

== Other activities ==
=== European Union organizations ===
- European Investment Bank (EIB), Ex-Officio Member of the Board of Governors (since 2019)
- European Stability Mechanism (ESM), Ex-Officio Member of the Board of Governors (since 2020)

=== International organizations ===
- African Development Bank (AfDB), Ex-Officio Alternate Member of the Board of Governors (since 2020)
- Asian Development Bank (ADB), Ex-Officio Member of the Board of Governors (since 2020)
- Asian Infrastructure Investment Bank (AIIB), Ex-Officio Member of the Board of Governors (since 2020)
- European Bank for Reconstruction and Development (EBRD), Ex-Officio Member of the Board of Governors (since 2020)
- Inter-American Development Bank (IADB), Ex-Officio Member of the Board of Governors (since 2020)
- International Monetary Fund (IMF), Ex-Officio Alternate Member of the Board of Governors (since 2020)
- World Bank, Ex-Officio Member of the Board of Governors (since 2020)
