= Vincent Van Quickenborne =

Belgian politician (born 1973)

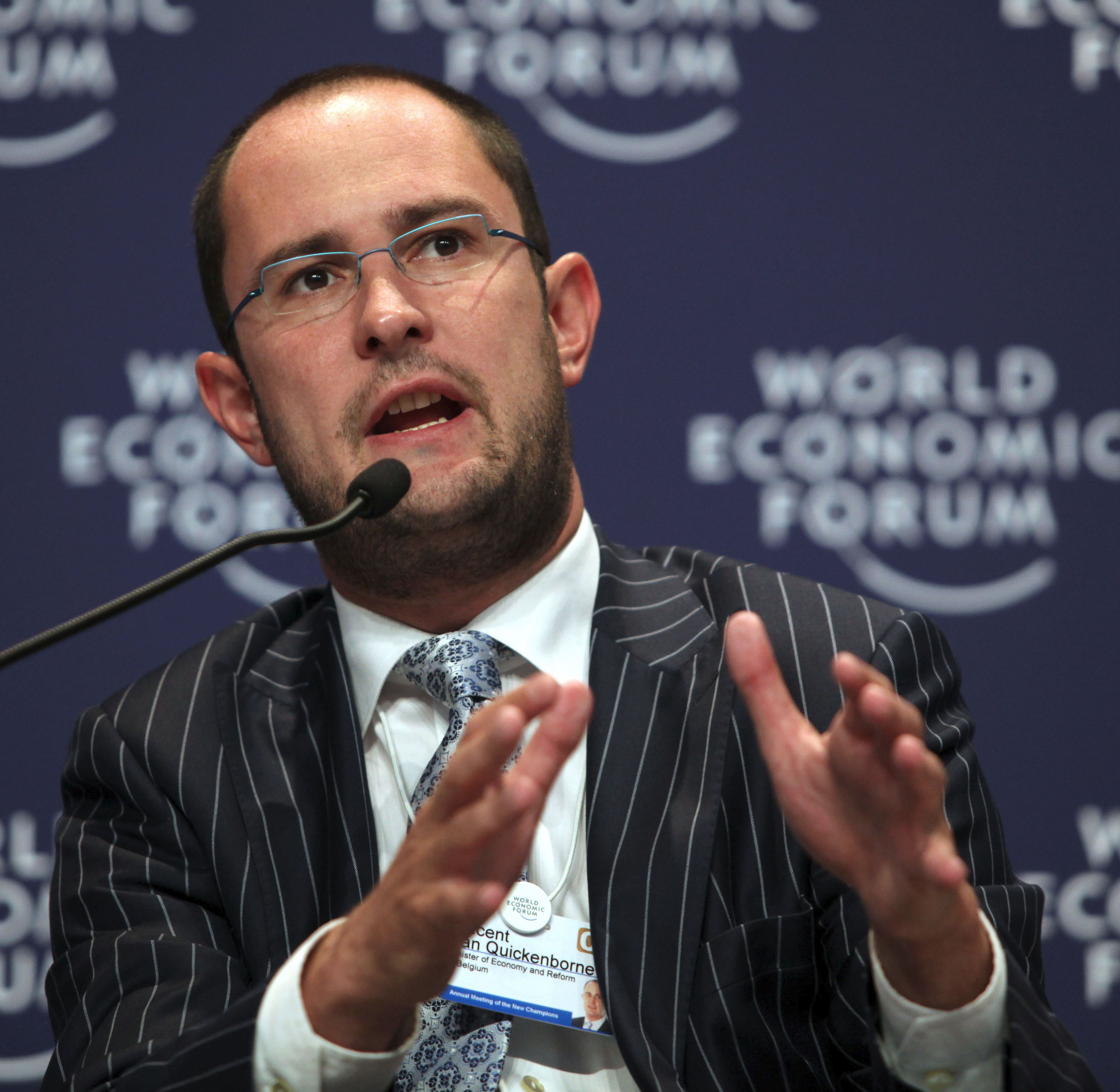
- Van Quickenborne in 2009

Minister of Justice and the North Sea
- In office 1 October 2020 – 20 October 2023
- Prime Minister: Alexander De Croo
- Preceded by: Koen Geens (Minister of Justice); Philippe De Backer (Minister of the North Sea)
- Succeeded by: Paul Van Tigchelt

Mayor of Kortrijk
- Incumbent
- Assumed office 1 February 2013
- Preceded by: Stefaan De Clerck

Personal details
- Born: 1 August 1973 (age 53) Ghent, Belgium
- Party: People's Union (1997-2001); Spirit (2001-2002); Anders (since 2002)
- Education: Catholic University of Leuven

Vincent Paul Marie Van Quickenborne (born 1 August 1973) is a Belgian politician for Anders (formerly Open Flemish Liberals and Democrats) who served as Minister of Justice in the government of Prime Minister Alexander De Croo from 2020 to 2023.

== Background ==
Van Quickenborne was born in Ghent. He attended Sint-Barbaracollege, a public Jesuit school in Ghent and went on to study law at the Catholic University of Leuven/Louvain (KU Leuven). He then practised at the Kortrijk/Courtrai bar.

== Political career ==
Van Quickenborne was a Senator (1999-2003), Secretary of State (junior minister) responsible for the simplification of the administration (2003–2007), Minister for entrepreneurship and simplification (2008–2011), Deputy Prime Minister and Pensions Minister (2011–2012), Deputy Prime Minister and Minister of Justice and North Sea (2020-2023). He was a member of the Chamber of Representatives (2003, 2007-2008, 2010-2011 and 2012-2020). Since 2013 he has been mayor of Kortrijk.

As Pensions Minister, he was responsible for pushing controversial pension reforms through Parliament. He then left the Government to become mayor of Kortrijk, returning as Minister of Justice in 2022. In September 2022 he was the subject of a kidnap plot, reported to be linked to drug criminals. A car containing firearms was found outside his house, and his security was stepped up. In September 2023 Van Quickenborne was involved in a scandal dubbed "pipigate" by the media when CCTV footage emerged of guests at his 50th birthday party urinating on a police van belonging to his protection detail. He apologised to Parliament and denied having joked about the incident.

In October 2023, Van Quickenborne resigned as Minister of Justice after the 2023 Brussels shooting; by stepping down, he took political responsibility for Belgian authorities not having complied with a request from Tunisia to extradite the attacker, Abdesalam Lassoued, in August 2022.

== Personal life ==
Van Quickenborne is married to Anouk Sabbe. The couple has three children, the youngest born in May 2023.
