= Antwerp building collapse =

2021 building collapse in Antwerp, Belgium

Coordinates: 51°12′20″N 4°23′00″E

- Date: 18 June 2021
- Location: Antwerp, Belgium
- Type: building collapse
- Deaths: 5
- Injuries: 20

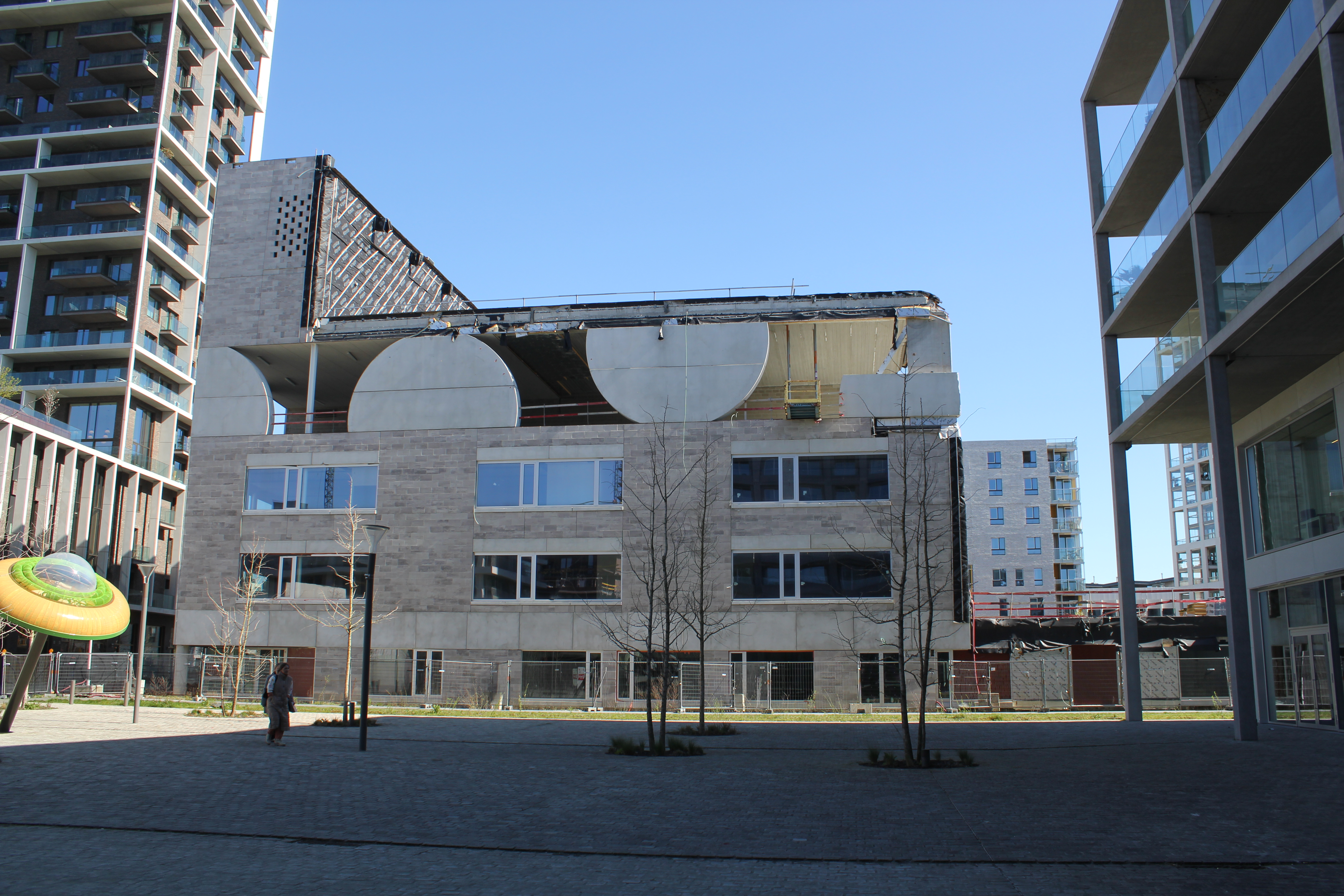
The school building in 2023

On 18 June 2021, a building collapse occurred at a school construction site in Antwerp, Belgium. Five construction workers were killed and 20 more wounded.

== Event ==
The disaster happened on a new development project where a new primary school was being constructed in the suburb of Nieuw Zuid. The construction workers were mostly Portuguese and Romanian, employed legally and living in the Antwerp area. On the afternoon of 18 June, scaffolding and parts of the building collapsed. The cause is unknown. The project was developed by Compagnie-O architects and executed by the construction firm Democo, The victims were all foreign workers, including three Portuguese nationals, one Russian and one Romanian.

The Belga news agency reported that the sub-contractors worked for construction firm Democo.

== Response ==
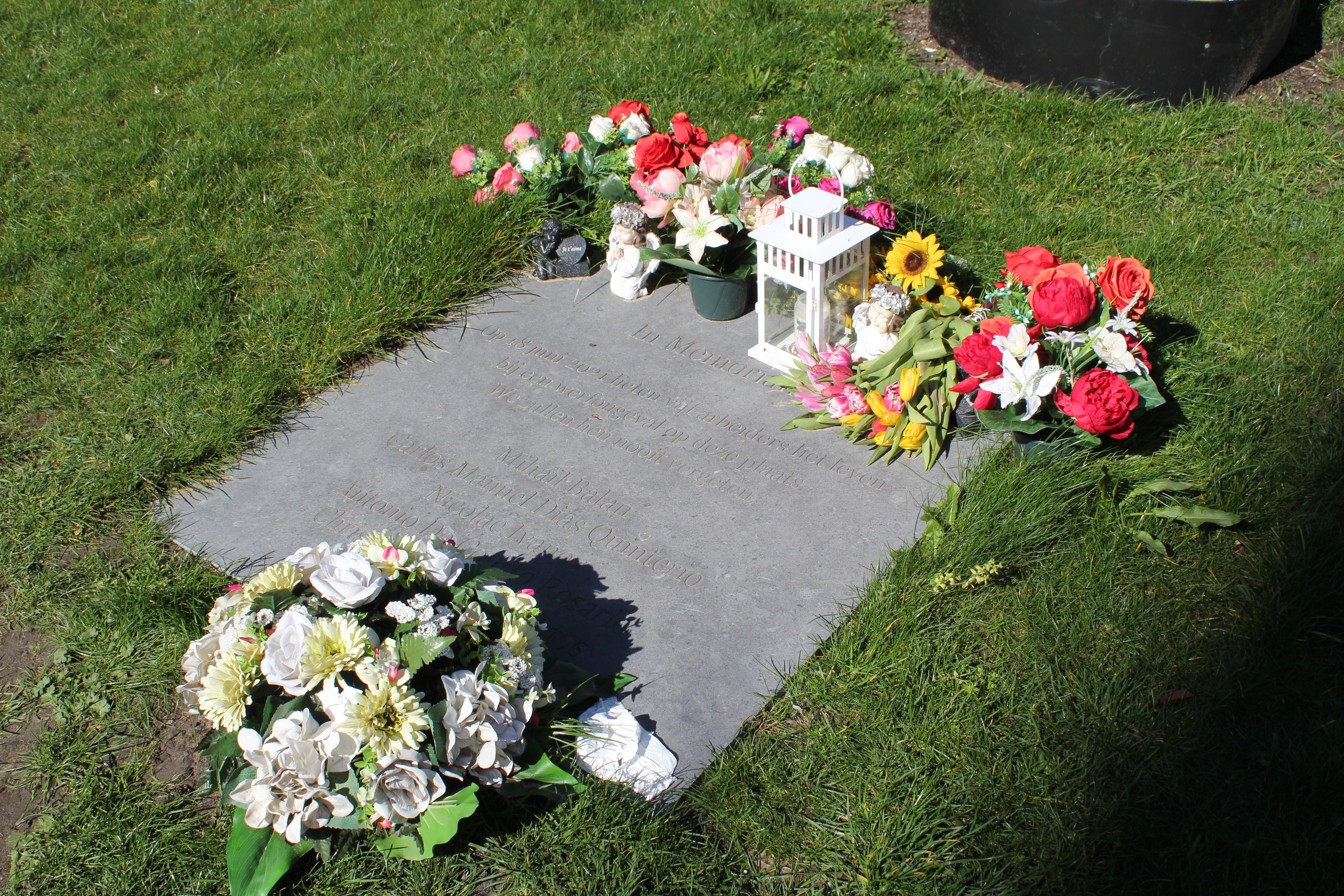
Commemorative stone with the names of the victims

The following day, King Philippe of Belgium and Prime Minister Alexander De Croo visited the site and spoke with emergency workers. An investigation is underway.

== See also ==
- Surfside condominium building collapse, which happened in Miami, Florida, six days later
