= Mathieu Michel (politician) =

Belgian politician

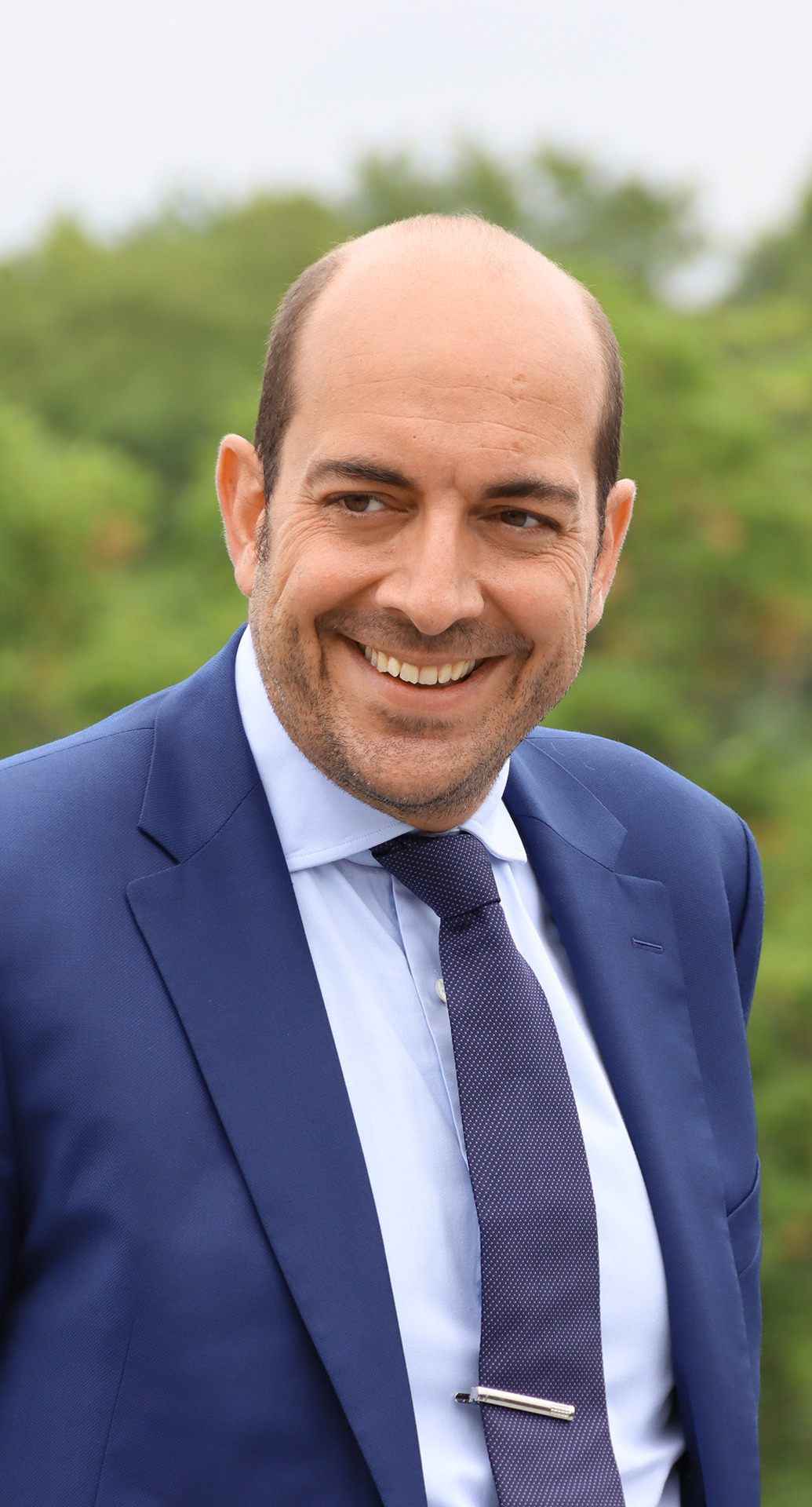
- Mathieu Michel in 2022

Secretary of State for Digitisation, Administrative Simplification, Privacy Protection and Building Regulation
- In office 1 October 2020 – 3 February 2025
- Monarch: Philippe
- Prime Minister: Alexander De Croo
- Preceded by: Philippe De Backer
- Succeeded by: Vincent Van Peteghem (as Minister of Administrative Simplification); Vanessa Matz (as Minister of Digitisation and Building Regulation)

Member of the Chamber of Representatives
- Incumbent
- Assumed office 10 July 2024
- Constituency: Walloon Brabant

Personal details
- Born: 18 May 1979 (age 47) Namur, Belgium
- Party: MR
- Relatives: Louis Michel; Charles Michel
- Education: EFAP Lille

Mathieu Michel (born 18 May 1979) is a French-speaking Belgian politician. He belongs to the Mouvement réformateur (MR).

He is the son of Louis Michel and the brother of Charles Michel.

He was elected provincial councillor for Walloon Brabant in 2000, and became a provincial deputy six years later. In 2012, at the head of a "purple coalition" with the Socialist Party (PS), he was elected president of the provincial college. He retains this position after the 2018 elections.

He entered the federal government in October 2020, as Secretary of State for Digitization, in charge of Administrative Simplification, Privacy Protection and Building Regulation. In this capacity, he is assistant to Flemish liberal Prime Minister Alexander De Croo.

Michel was elected to the Belgian Federal Parliament from Walloon Brabant in the 2024 Belgian federal election.

== Biography ==
=== Family ===
Born on 18 May 1979, Mathieu Michel is the second son of Belgian Minister of State Louis Michel, and brother of former Belgian Prime Minister Charles Michel.

=== Political debut and rise ===
He entered politics in 1994 as a member of the Young Liberal Reformers, and was elected provincial councillor of Walloon Brabant in 2000, and then councillor of the Public Centre for Social Welfare (CPAS) of Jodoigne in 2001. He was also appointed leader of the Reform Movement in the provincial council at the same time.

In the municipal and provincial elections of 8 October 2006 he was re-elected provincial councillor with 5,402 preferential votes and also won a mandate as municipal councillor in Jodoigne with 1,033 preferential votes. Although his personal communal score could have enabled him to obtain a post of alderman, he was appointed provincial deputy.

=== Provincial President then Federal Secretary of State ===
On 26 October 2012 he became president of the Provincial College of Walloon Brabant.

He remained in this position until 1 October 2020, when he was appointed Secretary of State for Digitization, Administrative Simplification, Privacy Protection and Building Regulation in the De Croo government, forcing him to end his provincial mandate.

He provoked a controversy about the remuneration of Belgian politicians by making remarks that were considered out of touch with reality.
