= Vivaldi coalition =

Belgian political term

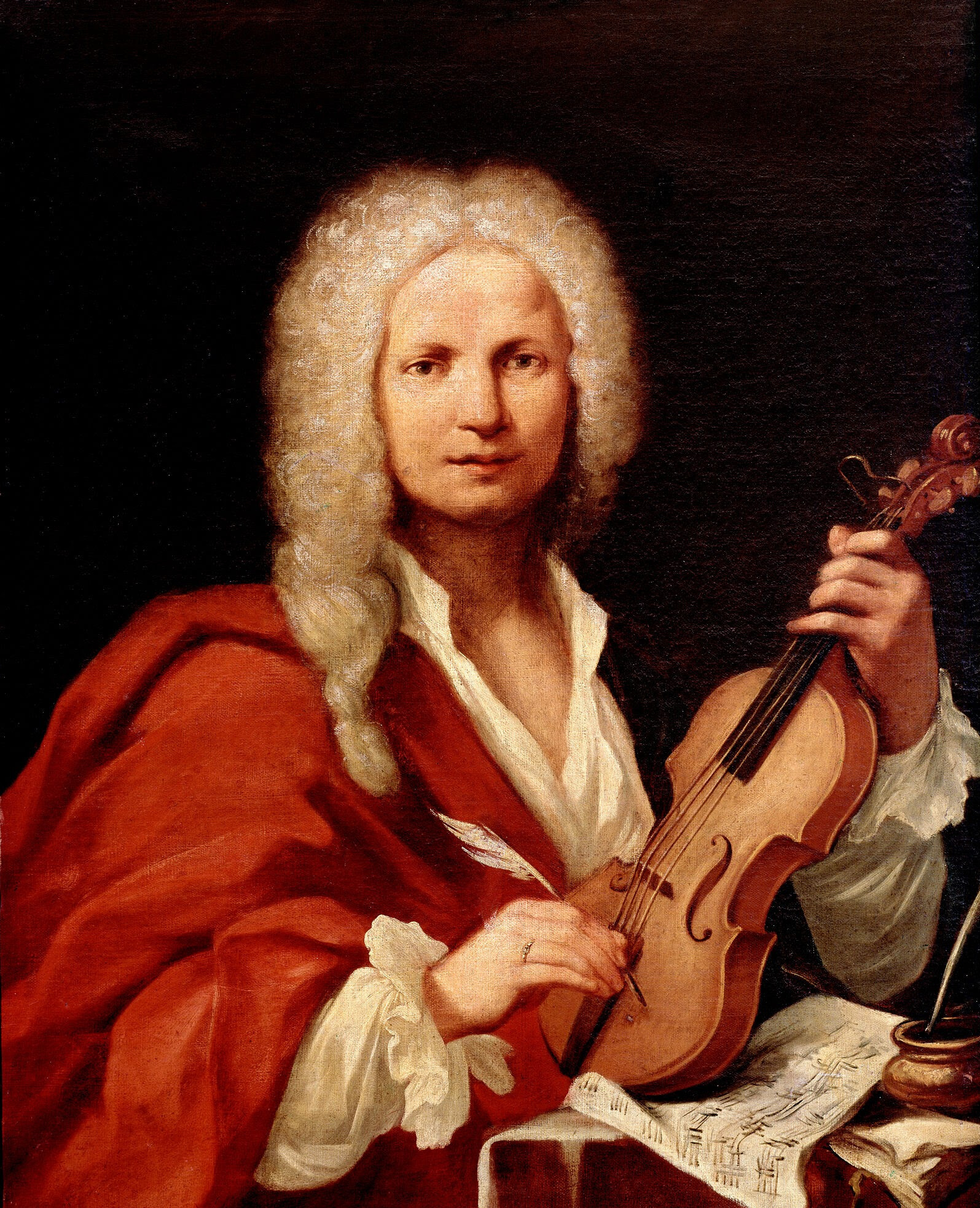
Antonio Vivaldi (1678–1741), composer of The Four Seasons.

The Vivaldi coalition (Dutch: Vivaldicoalitie; French: la coalition Vivaldi) is a neologism in Belgian politics describing a governing coalition among the parties of the liberals, social democrats, greens and Christian democrats.

In Germany, a comparable coalition of the CDU (black), the SPD (red), the FDP (yellow) and the Greens (green) is occasionally referred to as the Zimbabwe coalition (German: Simbabwe-Koalition), after the colours of the Zimbabwean flag or the Ghana coalition (German: Ghana-Koalition), after the colours of the Ghanan flag.

== Details ==
The coalition is named after the Italian violinist and composer Antonio Vivaldi and references his work The Four Seasons, due to the colors of the political ideologies within the coalition:

- blue (winter) for the liberals: Open Vld and Reformist Movement;
- green (spring) for the greens: Groen and Ecolo;
- red (summer) for the social democrats: Vooruit and Socialist Party;
- orange (autumn) for the Christian democrats: Christian Democratic and Flemish;

The term was first introduced by the newspaper La Libre Belgique in December 2019, during the 2019–2020 Belgian government formation. The first government from that combination was ultimately the De Croo Government.
