= Luc Bertrand =

Belgian businessman

Luc Jacques Leon Cesar, Baron Bertrand (born 14 February 1951) is a Belgian businessman. He is the CEO of Ackermans & van Haaren, a company active in construction, dredging, and environmental services, human resources services, financial services, and private equity. The company is headquartered in Antwerp, Belgium.

== Education ==
Luc Jacques Leon Cesar Bertrand attended secondary school at the jesuit Onze Lieve Vrouwecollege, Antwerp, where he studied Classic Humanities. In 1974, he obtained a master's degree as a commercial engineer at the Katholieke Universiteit Leuven (Leuven, Belgium).

== Career ==
He started his career in 1974 at the Corporate Finance Bankers Trust Co., in New York City, London (1976), Amsterdam (1978), New York (1980), London (1984). He became vice president of the company in 1980. His last assignment was in London from 1984 until 1986 as Regional Sales Manager, North Europe (Corporate Finance).

Since 1986, he has worked for Ackermans & van Haaren N.V., first as a Director. From March 1987 as until February 1990 as Administrative and Finance Manager. From April 1990 until 1995 as Managing Director, and since 1996 as Chairman of the Executive Committee and Managing Director of Ackermans & van Haaren N.V. He is member of the business club Cercle de Lorraine.

== Sources ==
- Ackermans & van Haaren
- Cercle de Lorraine
