= Saint Ignatius University Centre, Antwerp =

- Former names: St. Ignatius School for Higher Education in Commerce (1852-1960); Universitaire Faculteiten Sint-Ignatius Antwerpen (1960-2003)
- Type: Independent non-profit organization
- Established: 2003
- Religious affiliation: Christianity (Jesuit)
- Director: Erik De Bom
- Location: Koningstraat 2 B-2000 Antwerp, Antwerp, Belgium
- Website: UCSIA

St. Ignatius University Centre, Antwerp (UCSIA) is an independent continuation of the Jesuit effort to keep the Christian influence alive on to education after its predecessor the Universitaire Faculteiten Sint-Ignatius Antwerpen (UFSIA) joined two other universities to become the public University of Antwerp in 2003.

== History ==
=== Early history ===
The roots of UCSIA go back to Sint-Ignatius Handelshogeschool (Saint-Ignatius School for Higher Education in Commerce) founded by the Jesuit (Society of Jesus) in Antwerp in 1852. This was one of the first European business schools to offer formal university degrees. It later opened a Faculty of Literature and Philosophy (including Law) and a Faculty of Political and Social Sciences. It was renamed Universitaire Faculteiten Sint-Ignatius Antwerpen (UFSIA) in the 1960s when the Belgian Government granted it university status.

In the early 1970s UFSIA joined into a confederation with "Rijksuniversitair Centrum Antwerpen" (RUCA) and "Universitaire Instelling Antwerpen" (UIA), public institutions.

In 2003 UFSIA, RUCA, and UIA merged into the University of Antwerp to become the first explicitly pluralistic university in Belgium, offering philosophical, ethical, and spiritual discourse and openness towards religious and intercultural dialogue. It soon became the third largest university in Flanders with 20,000 students.

Since UFSIA became a part of a public university, the Jesuits maintained a think-tank. This think-tank became the University Centre Saint-Ignatius Antwerp (UCSIA), an independent, non-profit, international, and interdisciplinary organisation whose aim is to maintain the Jesuit influence in higher education.

== See also ==
- List of Jesuit sites
