= Alexander De Croo =

Prime Minister of Belgium from 2020 to 2025

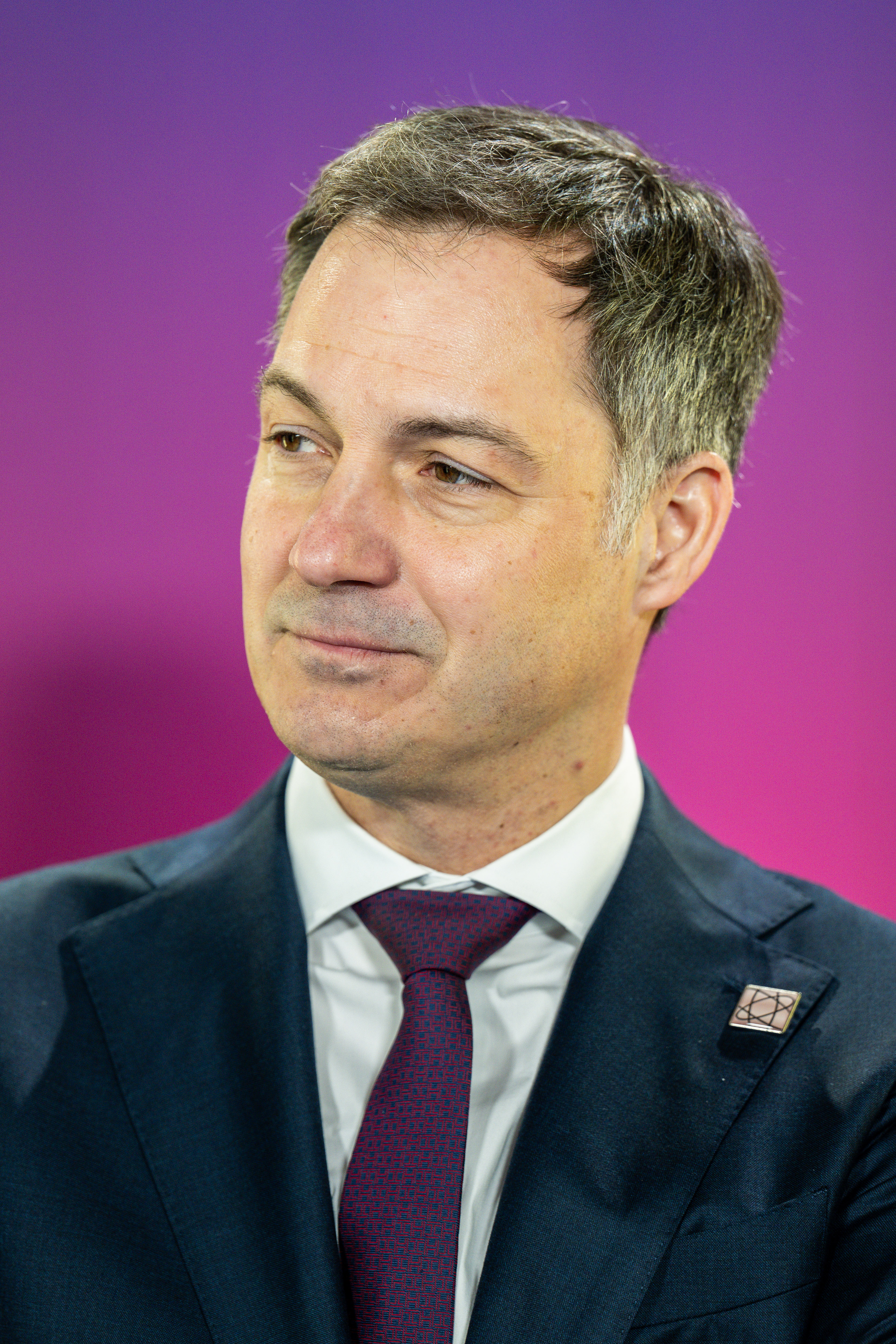
- De Croo in 2024

Prime Minister of Belgium
- In office 1 October 2020 – 3 February 2025
- Monarch: Philippe
- Deputy: See list: Vincent Van Peteghem Georges Gilkinet Petra De Sutter Sophie Wilmès Vincent Van Quickenborne Pierre-Yves Dermagne Frank Vandenbroucke David Clarinval
- Preceded by: Sophie Wilmès
- Succeeded by: Bart De Wever

Minister of Finance
- In office 9 December 2018 – 1 October 2020
- Prime Minister: Charles Michel; Sophie Wilmès
- Preceded by: Johan Van Overtveldt
- Succeeded by: Vincent Van Peteghem

Minister of Development Cooperation
- In office 11 October 2014 – 1 October 2020
- Prime Minister: Charles Michel; Sophie Wilmès
- Preceded by: Jean-Pascal Labille
- Succeeded by: Meryame Kitir

Minister for the Digital Agenda, Telecommunications and Postal service
- In office 11 October 2014 – 9 December 2018
- Prime Minister: Charles Michel
- Preceded by: None
- Succeeded by: Philippe De Backer

Minister of Pensions
- In office 22 October 2012 – 11 October 2014
- Prime Minister: Elio Di Rupo
- Preceded by: Vincent Van Quickenborne
- Succeeded by: Daniel Bacquelaine

Deputy Prime Minister of Belgium
- In office 22 October 2012 – 1 October 2020
- Prime Minister: Elio Di Rupo; Charles Michel; Sophie Wilmès
- Preceded by: Vincent Van Quickenborne
- Succeeded by: Vincent Van Quickenborne

Leader of the Open Flemish Liberals and Democrats
- In office 12 December 2009 – 22 October 2012
- Deputy: Vincent Van Quickenborne; Patricia Ceysens
- Preceded by: Guy Verhofstadt (acting)
- Succeeded by: Guy Verhofstadt (acting)

Vice President of Open VLD
- In office 24 August 2024 – 17 October 2025
- President: Eva De Bleeker

Personal details
- Born: 3 November 1975 (age 50) Vilvoorde, Belgium
- Party: Anders
- Spouse: Annik Penders
- Children: 2
- Education: Vrije Universiteit Brussel (MSc); Northwestern University (MBA)
- Website: www.alexanderdecroo.be

Alexander De Croo (Dutch: [aːlɛkˈsɑndər də ˈkroː]; born 3 November 1975) is a Belgian politician and businessman who serves as Administrator of the United Nations Development Programme (UNDP). He was Prime Minister of Belgium from 2020 to 2025. Previously from 2012 to 2020, De Croo served as deputy prime minister in the governments of Elio Di Rupo, Charles Michel, and Sophie Wilmès. During his tenure as deputy prime minister he served as the Minister of Pensions from 2012 to 2014, as Minister of Development Cooperation from 2014 to 2020, and as Minister of Finance from 2018 to 2020. On 1 October 2020, over a year after the 2019 federal elections, the De Croo Government was formed to replace Wilmès' minority government, with De Croo as prime minister.

De Croo was born in Vilvoorde and studied business engineering at the Vrije Universiteit Brussel before attaining an MBA at Northwestern University in the United States. He worked for Boston Consulting Group before starting his own company, Darts-ip, in 2006. De Croo became involved with the Belgian political party Open Vlaamse Liberalen en Democraten (Open VLD), of which he was chairman from 2009 to 2012.

After the 2024 Belgian federal election, De Croo and his party suffered a major electoral defeat. De Croo announced his resignation on 9 June 2024. De Croo remained as caretaker prime minister until the new government was formed on 3 February 2025, being succeeded by Bart De Wever, leader of the N-VA. In May 2026, he was awarded the honorary title of Minister of State.

== Early life and career ==
Alexander De Croo was born on 3 November 1975 in Vilvoorde in Flemish Brabant, Belgium, and was one of two children of the politician and Minister of State Herman De Croo and his wife Françoise Desguin. In 1993, he attended the Vrije Universiteit Brussel where he graduated in 1998 in Business Engineering. He attended Northwestern University in Evanston, Illinois, in 2002, and completed an MBA at the Kellogg School of Management in 2004. Prior to his political career, De Croo became a project leader at Boston Consulting Group in 1999. In 2006 he founded a new company called Darts-ip that specialized in providing services to intellectual property professionals.

== Early political career ==
In 2009, De Croo participated for the first time in politics, standing in the 2009 European elections. He received more than 47,000 votes. On 26 October, De Croo became a candidate for the presidency of his political party, Open Flemish Liberals and Democrats (Open VLD), to succeed the transitional party president, Guy Verhofstadt. He chose Vincent Van Quickenborne and Patricia Ceysens as his running mates to compete against Marino Keulen and Gwendolyn Rutten. On 12 December, he was elected president in the second round with 11,676 votes; Marino Keulen received 9,614 votes. His election was considered remarkable as he had almost no previous experience as a politician.

=== Political crisis ===
Five months after being elected party leader, De Croo threatened to withdraw the Open VLD from the governing coalition if there was no solution to the constitutional dispute in the Brussels-Halle-Vilvoorde voting issue. After Open VLD's deadline passed the party left the government and then Prime Minister Yves Leterme announced the government's resignation. This was accepted by King Albert II on 26 April 2010. During the elections for the Senate in 2010, De Croo obtained more than 301,000 votes, the third most in the Dutch-speaking constituency and served as a senator until 22 October 2012.

== Career in government ==
=== Part of the Di Rupo government ===
De Croo succeeded Van Quickenborne in the Di Rupo Government as deputy prime minister and Minister of Pensions on 22 October 2012 after Van Quickenborne resigned to become mayor of Kortrijk. In December Gwendolyn Rutten was elected as the new chairwoman of Open VLD.

=== Part of the Michel I and II governments ===
After the 2014 Belgian federal election and its Federal Government formation, it was decided that he would remain deputy prime minister in the newly formed Michel I Government. De Croo also became Minister of Development Cooperation, Digital Agenda, Telecom and Postal Services while Daniel Bacquelaine took over from him as Minister of Pensions. This government took office on 11 October 2014.

During De Croo's time in office, Belgium became the first country to suspend official development assistance to Burundi after the beginning of violent unrest in the African country from 2015. In 2017, De Croo pledged €25 million ($26.81 million) through 2025 to eradicate African sleeping sickness. He also was one of the founders of the She Decides movement, a reaction against the re-installation of the Mexico City Policy by President Donald Trump.

After a disagreement within the government over the UN Global Compact for Migration, the N-VA left the governing coalition, causing the administration to become a minority government on 9 December 2018, known as Michel II. De Croo became Minister of Finance, replacing Johan Van Overtveldt.

In December 2018, De Croo took the stage during the Global Citizen Festival Mandela 100 concert in Johannesburg, South Africa. It was the final event of the international campaign #SheIsEqual for women's rights which attracted €780 million in commitments.

=== Part of the Wilmès I and II governments ===
Under the caretaker administration of Prime Minister Sophie Wilmès, he oversaw a financial stimulus package to tackle the COVID-19 crisis and a deal to save Brussels Airlines in 2020. He was elected joint deputy chairman of Open VLD, together with Egbert Lachaert.

== Premiership (2020–2025) ==
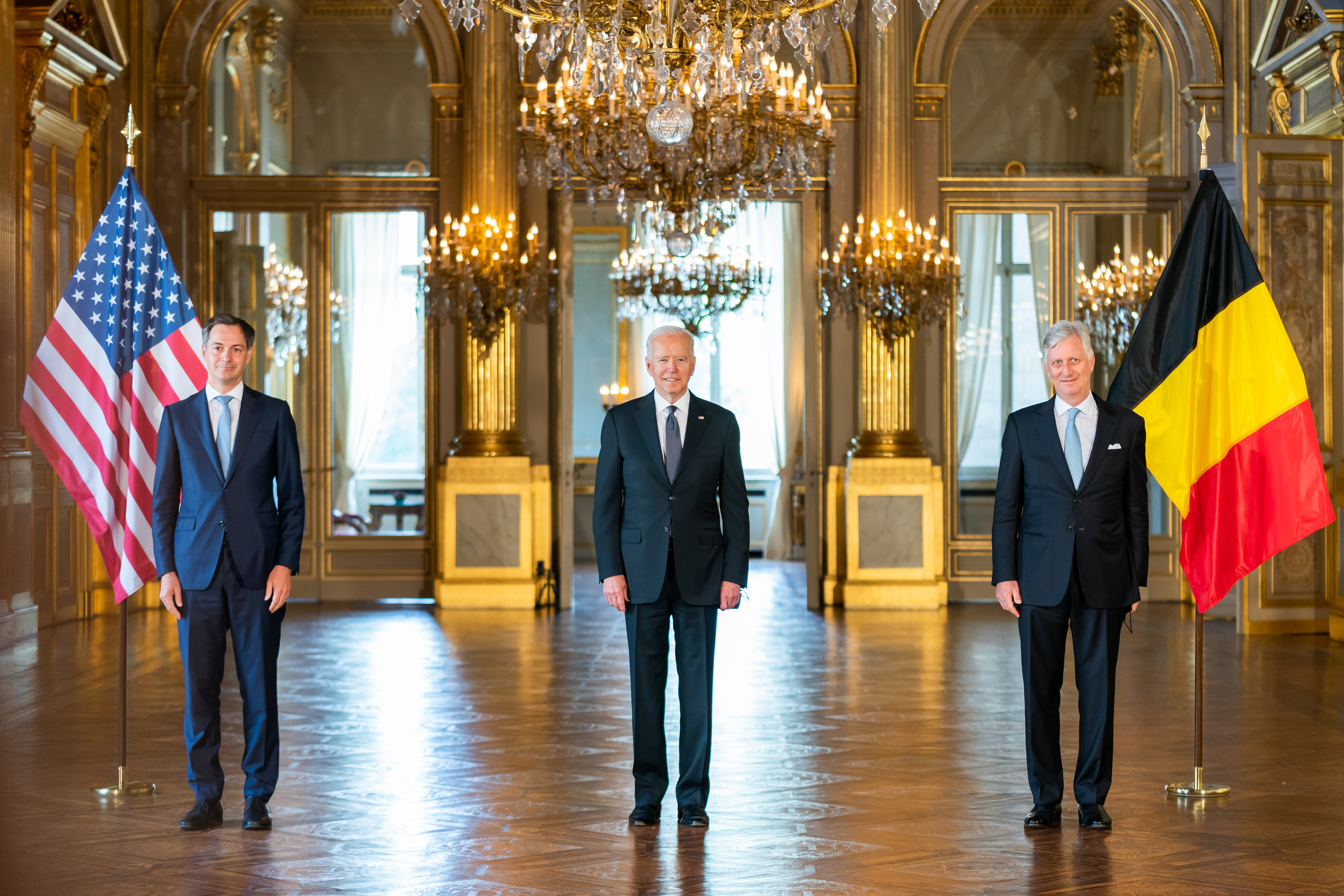
De Croo with U.S. President Joe Biden and King Philippe, 15 June 2021

On 23 September 2020, Alexander De Croo and Paul Magnette (PS) were appointed by the King to form a government as a so-called "Vivaldi coalition". On 30 September 2020, it was announced that De Croo would take over the position of prime minister, succeeding Wilmès. De Croo's government has a higher proportion of women ministers than any previous Belgian government: half of the ministers are women.

The formation of the Belgian government took a considerable amount of time. The book De doodgravers van België by Wouter Verschelden states that the main reason for the prolonged negotiations was a scandal about communication between De Croo and an Italian pornographic film actress. In August 2021, Corriere della Sera quoted statements by the implicated actress, claiming that De Croo had messaged her seeking a meeting and that they had not met, but had continued to exchange messages.

In June 2021, he visited the site of the Antwerp building collapse with King Philippe of Belgium and spoke to emergency workers.

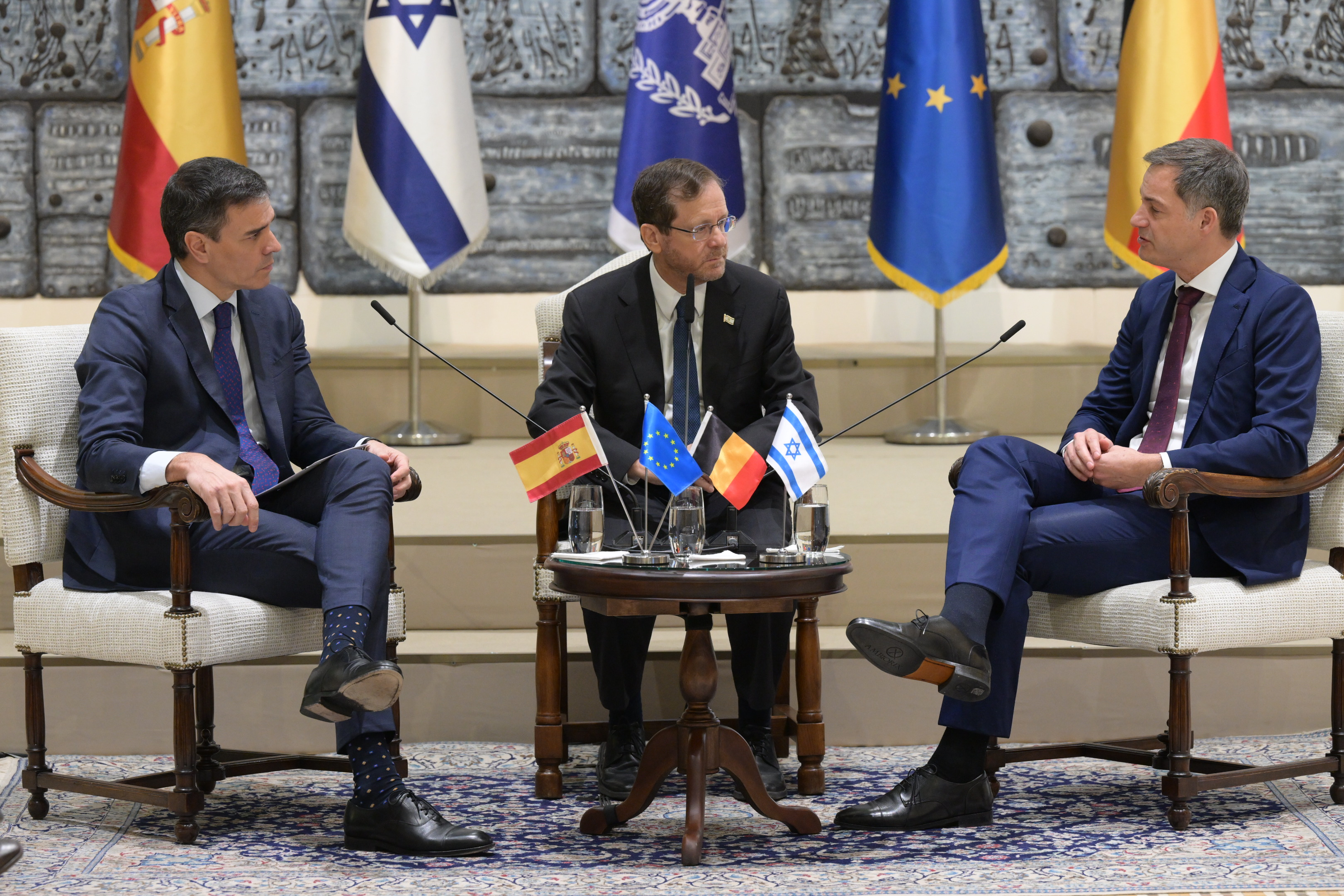
De Croo with Israeli President Isaac Herzog and Spanish Prime Minister Pedro Sánchez in Beit HaNassi, Jerusalem, Israel, 23 November 2023. In the background an Israeli relief made of basalt ash.

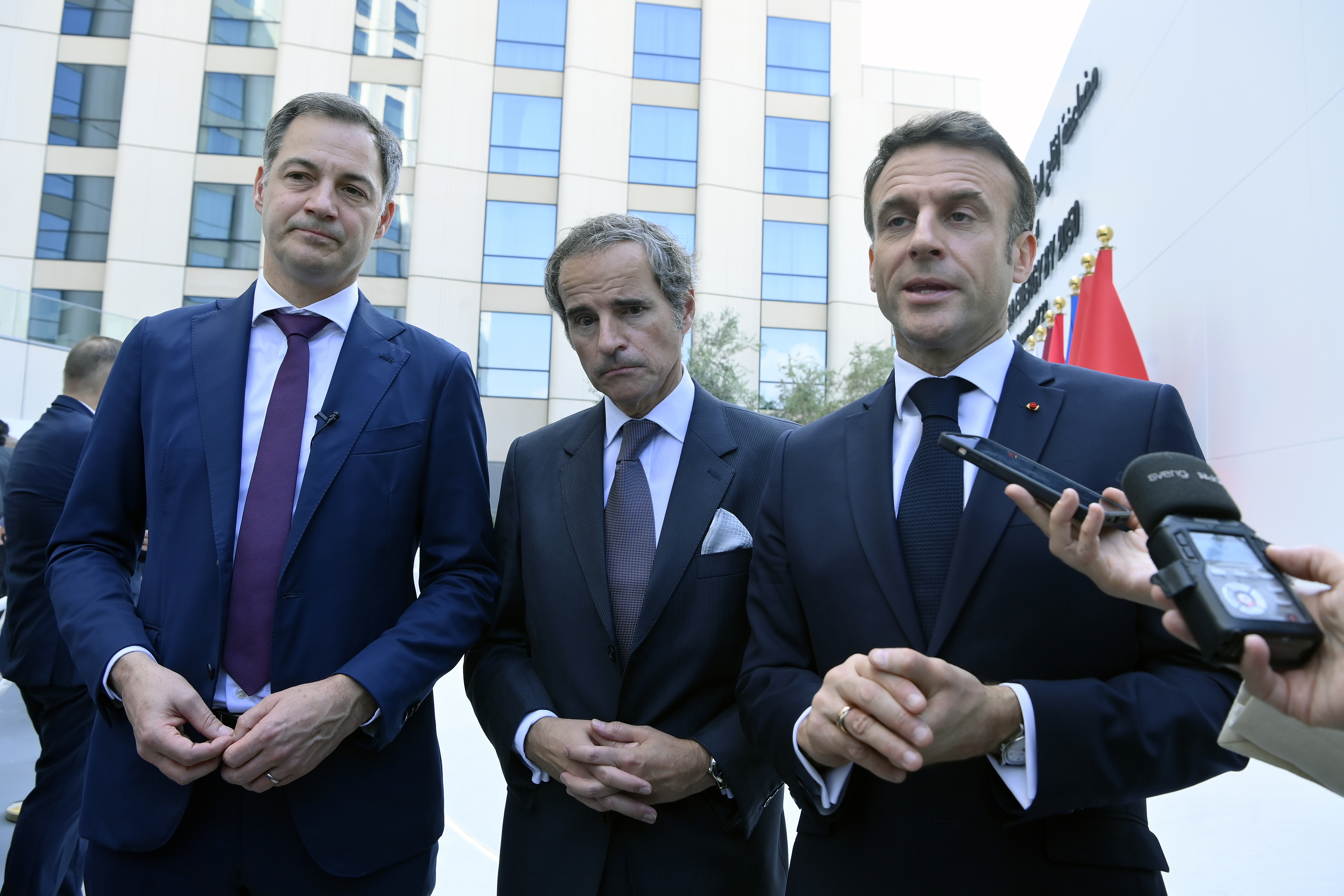
De Croo with IAEA Director General Rafael Grossi and French President Emmanuel Macron in Dubai, United Arab Emirates, 2 December 2023

In February 2022, the government adopted a law to make the labour market more flexible: employees have the option, provided that their company agrees, of switching to a four-day week. In return, their working days would be extended to 9.5 hours (corresponding to a 38-hour week). The law also makes working hours between 8 p.m. and midnight more flexible, as they are no longer considered as night work and do not give employees entitlement to any compensation.

The government wants to increase military spending to 2 per cent of GDP in order to comply with the demands of NATO and the U.S. government, which is causing tension within its coalition. The right-wing supports the plan, but the ecologists are opposed, arguing that the government should have other priorities than the military, while the socialists remain undecided.

On 26 November 2022, De Croo and foreign minister Hadja Lahbib visited Ukraine, meeting Ukrainian president Volodymyr Zelenskyy and pledging continued Belgian support to Ukraine.

In November 2023, De Croo called the Israeli bombing campaign in the Gaza Strip "disproportionate", but said that "Belgium will not take sides" in the Gaza war. The Israeli government accused him of "supporting terrorism".

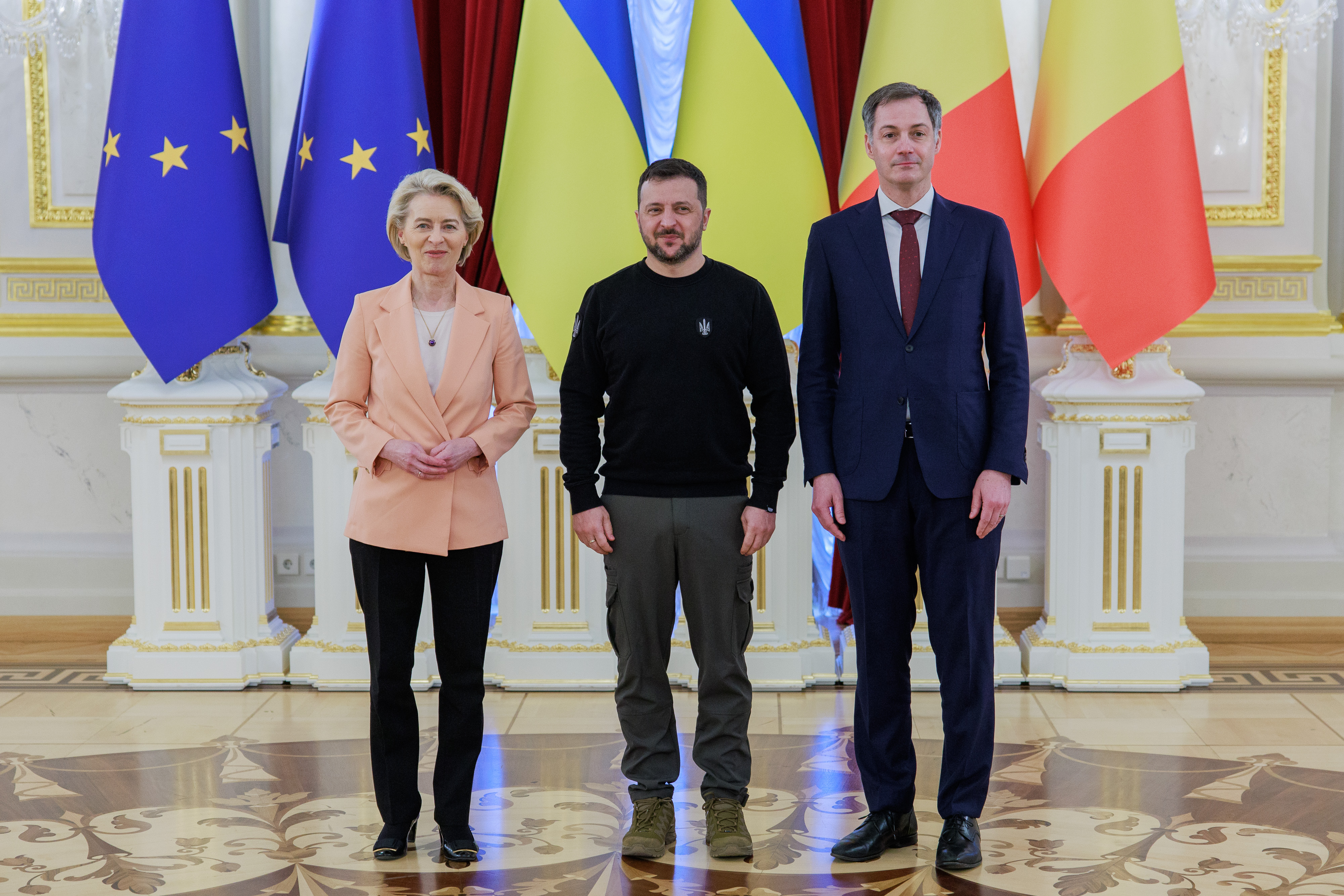
De Croo with President of the European Commission Ursula von der Leyen and Ukrainian President Volodymyr Zelenskyy in Kyiv, Ukraine, 24 February 2024

On 26 February 2024 De Croo travelled to Paris, where Emmanuel Macron was holding an emergency summit over the situation in Ukraine, as they had just suffered the loss of Avdiivka. Czech PM Petr Fiala proposed the purchase of 500,000 rounds of artillery ammunition for Ukrainian forces. This was the second time in one month the Czech government had aired the matter. The French had previously vetoed the idea to obtain the ammunition from foreign sources. The Dutch government of Mark Rutte announced, through him on that day in Paris, that it would provide €100 million for this purpose, and De Croo announced that his government would provide €200 million. Fiala managed to attract 15 nations to his cause. The prime minister of Portugal, Antonio Costa, said that the group defence ministers had been tasked with a 7 March deadline to formulate and execute the plan.

Following the release of the 2024 Belgian federal election results, De Croo and his party suffered a major electoral defeat. De Croo, following protocol, announced his resignation as prime minister effective on 10 June. After this, he remained as caretaker prime minister until the formation of a new federal government.

In September 2024, during their welcome addresses for Pope Francis on his visit to the country, De Croo, along with King Philippe, publicly criticised the Catholic Church over sexual abuses committed by clergy in Belgium. On his return flight to Rome, Francis said "abortion is murder" and that "science says that just one month from conception, all the organs are present". He compared the abortion doctors to hitmen. Contemporaneously, Belgium has considered whether to expand access to abortion from the first 12 weeks to 18 weeks. De Croo said he would summon the Belgian apostolic nuncio, Franco Coppola, so as to protest the pope's remarks as an “unacceptable” interference in his country’s domestic affairs.

On 3 February 2025, De Croo was succeeded as prime minister by Bart De Wever, leader of the N-VA and mayor of Antwerp.

== United Nations (2025-now) ==
On 17 November 2025, UN Secretary-General António Guterres named De Croo as the new Administrator of the United Nations Development Programme (UNDP), for a four-year term, following the appointment UN General Assembly confirmation. De Croo was also appointed as UN Under-Secretary-General. UNDP works in 170 countries and territories and its mandate is to eradicate poverty and reduce inequalities. De Croo started his mandate on 2 December 2025.

== Political views and ideology ==
Like the majority of party leaders in Belgium, De Croo is in favour of greater limits on the political power of the Belgian monarch. He is of the opinion that the monarch's power should be ceremonial, similar to that of other Western European monarchs.

== Personal life ==
De Croo is married to Annik Penders and they have two children. He is a keen equestrian and takes part in a formal event each year together with his father; in 2010 he broke a foot and an elbow when he fell from his horse. He is fluent in Dutch and English, as well as French, the native language of his mother.

== Other activities ==
=== European Union organizations ===
- European Investment Bank (EIB), ex-officio member of the Board of Governors (2018-2020)
- European Stability Mechanism, member of the Board of Governors (2018-2020)

=== International organizations ===
- African Development Bank (AfDB), ex-officio member of the Board of Governors (2018-2020)
- Asian Development Bank (ADB), ex-officio member of the Board of Governors
- European Bank for Reconstruction and Development (EBRD), ex-officio member of the Board of Governors (2018-2020)

=== Non-profit organisations ===
- World Economic Forum (WEF), member of the Europe Policy Group (2017-2020)

== Honours ==
- Netherlands: Grand Cross of the Order of Orange-Nassau (2023)
- Luxembourg: Grand Cross of the Order of Merit of the Grand Duchy of Luxembourg (2024)
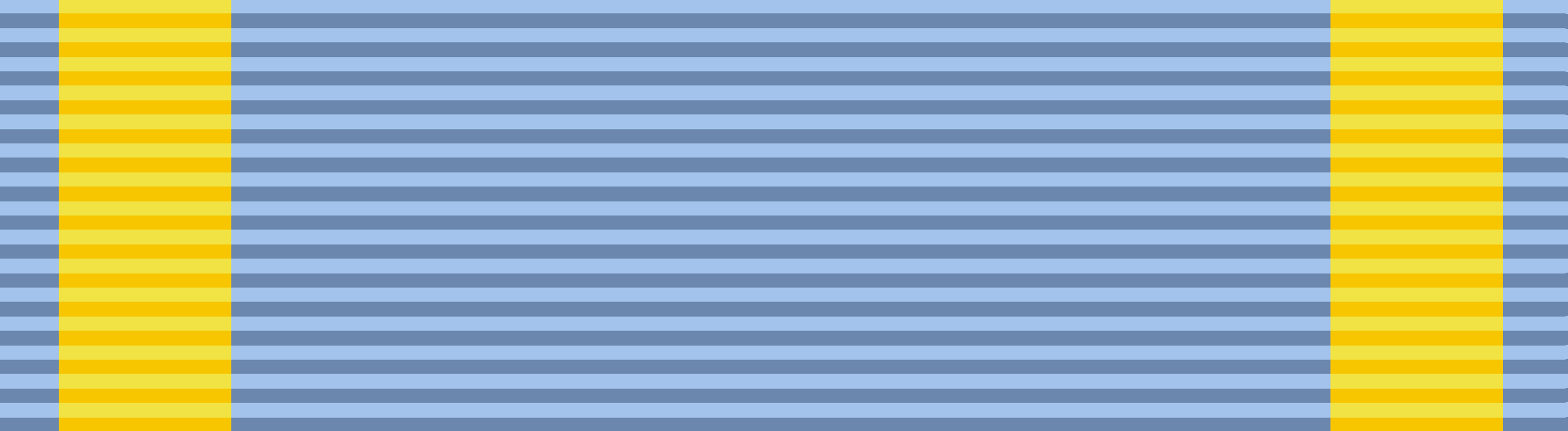
- Ukraine: First Class of the Order of Prince Yaroslav the Wise (26 August 2024)

Political offices
Preceded by Vincent Van Quickenborne	Deputy Prime Minister of Belgium; 2012–2020	Succeeded by Vincent Van Quickenborne
Preceded by Vincent Van Quickenborne	Minister of Pensions; 2012–2014	Succeeded by Daniel Bacquelaine
Preceded by Jean-Pascal Labille	Minister of Development Cooperation; 2014-2020	Succeeded by Meryame Kitir
Preceded by Johan Van Overtveldt	Minister of Finance; 2018–2020	Succeeded by Vincent Van Peteghem
Preceded by Sophie Wilmès	Prime Minister of Belgium; 2020–2025	Succeeded by Bart De Wever
Academic offices
Preceded by Marcelo Rebelo de Sousa	Invocation Speaker of the College of Europe; 2021	Succeeded by Roberta Metsola
