= Benjamin Dalle =

Belgian politician (born 1982)

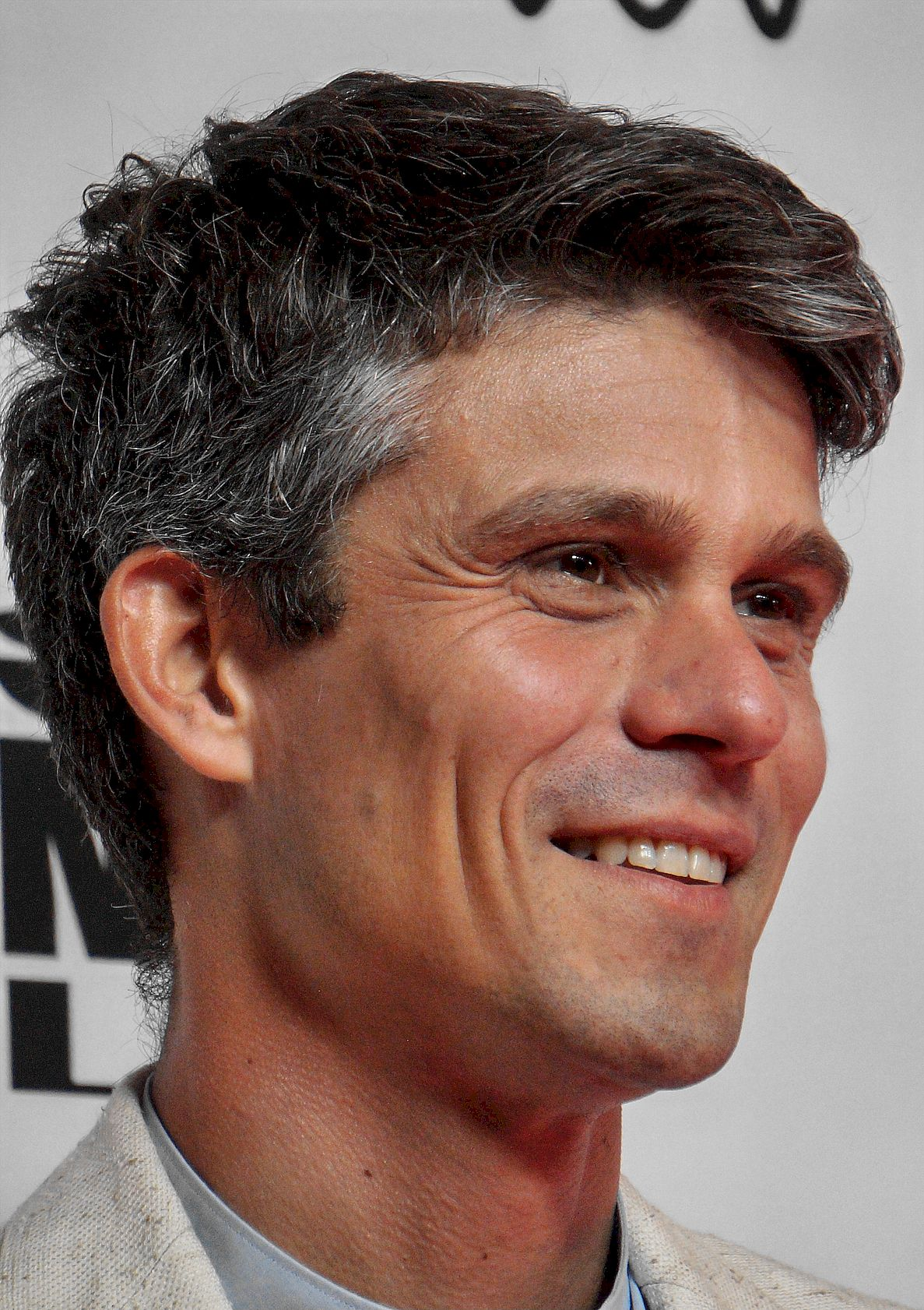
- Dalle in 2023

Flemish Minister of Media, Brussels, Youth and Poverty Reduction
- Incumbent
- Assumed office 2 October 2019
- Preceded by: Lydia Peeters (for culture and youth); Sven Gatz (for Brussels); Liesbeth Homans (for poverty reduction)

Personal details
- Born: 30 August 1982 (age 44) Brugge, Belgium
- Party: Christen-Democratisch en Vlaams
- Education: Ghent University; New York University

Benjamin Dalle (born 30 August 1982) is a Belgian politician.

As of 2 October 2019, he is minister for media, youth and Brussels in the Flemish government (Jambon Government) of Flemish minister-president Jan Jambon. Following the resignation of Wouter Beke in May 2022, he also holds the portfolio of poverty reduction.

In October 2023, it was announced he would lead his party's list for the Chamber of Representatives (Belgium) in Brussels for the upcoming 2024 Belgian federal election.

== Early life and career ==
Dalle was born in Brugge but grew up in Damme. He studied law at Ghent University between 2000 and 2005. Next, he obtained an LL.M at New York University and interned at UNHCR in Geneva. He worked as a lawyer in Brussels, and teaching assistant at Leuven University.

== Political career ==
Between 2007 and 2011, Dalle was an adviser to Yves Leterme, Jo Vandeurzen and Stephen Vanackere during their time in the Belgian federal government. At the end of 2011, he became chief of cabinet of Servais Verherstraeten, state secretary in the Di Rupo Government.

Following the 2014 Belgian federal election, Dalle played in advisory role in the government formation on the side of CD&V and subsequently became deputy chief of cabinet of Koen Geens, Minister of Justice in the Michel I Government until March 2016. From March 2016, he was head of the study service of the CD&V party. He was briefly a co-opted senator in the Belgian Senate between January and May 2019.

In October 2019, Dalle was named Flemish minister of media, youth and Brussels in the Flemish government of Jan Jambon. In May 2022, he received the additional portfolio of poverty reduction, following the resignation of Wouter Beke as Flemish minister of welfare. The change of portfolio was criticised by organisations in the field as showing little respect for the portfolio so close to an election.

In October 2023, it was announced he would lead his party's list for the Chamber of Representatives (Belgium) in Brussels in the upcoming 2024 Belgian federal election.
