= Flemish Region =

Northernmost federal region of Belgium

Flemish Region Vlaams Gewest (Dutch) Région flamande (French) Flämische Region (German)
- Region
- Flag Coat of arms
- Anthem: De Vlaamse Leeuw ("The Flemish Lion")
- Coordinates: 51°00′N 4°30′E
- Country: Belgium
- Community: Flemish Community
- Established: 1980
- Seat: City of Brussels (outside its territory)

Government
  - Executive: Flemish Government
  - Governing parties (2024): N-VA, Vooruit, CD&V
  - Minister-President: Matthias Diependaele (N-VA)
  - Legislature: Flemish Parliament
  - Speaker: Liesbeth Homans (N–VA)

Area
  - Total: 13,626 km^{2} (5,261 sq mi)

Population (1 January 2024)
  - Total: 6,821,770
  - Density: 500.64/km^{2} (1,296.7/sq mi)

Demographics
  - Ethnic group: Flemings
  - Official language: Dutch
  - Other language: French (Note: Language facilities for French speakers in Drogenbos, Kraainem, Linkebeek, Sint-Genesius-Rode, Wemmel, Wezembeek-Oppem.)

GDP
  - Total: €367.496 billion (2024)
  - Per capita: €53,871 (2024)
- ISO 3166 code: BE-VLG
- Celebration Day: 11 July
- Website: vlaanderen.be

The Flemish Region (Dutch: Vlaams Gewest, pronounced [ˌvlaːms xəˈʋɛst]), (Note: In isolation, gewest is pronounced [ɣəˈʋɛst].) (Note: French: Région flamande [ʁeʒjɔ̃ flamɑ̃d]; German: Flämische Region [ˈflɛːmɪʃə ʁeˈɡi̯oːn].) usually simply referred to as Flanders (Dutch: Vlaanderen [ˈvlaːndərə(n)]), (Note: French: Flandre [flɑ̃dʁ]; German: Flandern [ˈflandɐn].) is one of the three regions of Belgium—alongside the Walloon Region and the Brussels-Capital Region. Covering the northern portion of the country, the Flemish Region is Dutch-speaking. With an area of 13,626 km^{2} (5,261 sq mi), it accounts for only 45% of Belgium's territory, but 58% of its population. It is one of the most densely populated regions of Europe with around 500/km^{2} (1,300/sq mi).

The Flemish Region is distinct from the Flemish Community: the latter encompasses both the inhabitants of the Flemish Region and the Dutch-speaking inhabitants of the Brussels-Capital Region. It borders the Netherlands and France.

== Politics ==
Immediately after its establishment in 1980, the region transferred all its constitutional competencies to the Flemish Community. Thus, the current Flemish authorities (Flemish Parliament and Flemish Government) represent all the Flemish people, including those living in the Brussels-Capital Region. Hence, the Flemish Region is governed by the Flemish Community institutions. However, members of the Flemish Community parliament elected in the Brussels-Capital Region have no right to vote on Flemish regional affairs.

== Administrative divisions ==
Provinces in the Flemish Region

The Flemish Region comprises five provinces, each consisting of administrative arrondissements that, in turn, contain municipalities (in total 285 municipalities in Flanders).

The seat of the Flemish parliament is located in Brussels, which is an enclave within – but not part of – the Flemish region, being specified that the Brussels-Capital Region is established as an administrative region of Belgium in its own right. In contrast, the Walloon parliament has established its parliament in the territory of Wallonia, specifically in the city of Namur, Namur Province.

Province		Capital city	Administrative arrondissements	Population (1 January 2020)	Area	Population density
1	Antwerp (Antwerpen)	Antwerp (Antwerpen)	Antwerp, Mechelen, Turnhout	1,869,730	2,876 km^{2} (1,110 sq mi)	650/km^{2} (1,700/sq mi)
2	Limburg (Limburg)	Hasselt	Hasselt, Maaseik, Tongeren	877,370	2,427 km^{2} (937 sq mi)	360/km^{2} (930/sq mi)
3	East Flanders (Oost-Vlaanderen)	Ghent (Gent)	Aalst, Dendermonde, Eeklo, Gent, Oudenaarde, Sint-Niklaas	1,525,255	3,007 km^{2} (1,161 sq mi)	510/km^{2} (1,300/sq mi)
4	Flemish Brabant (Vlaams-Brabant)	Leuven	Halle-Vilvoorde, Leuven	1,155,843	2,118 km^{2} (818 sq mi)	550/km^{2} (1,400/sq mi)
5	West Flanders (West-Vlaanderen)	Bruges (Brugge)	Bruges, Diksmuide, Ypres, Kortrijk, Ostend, Roeselare, Tielt, Veurne	1,200,945	3,197 km^{2} (1,234 sq mi)	380/km^{2} (980/sq mi)
	Flemish Region		22	6,629,143	13,626 km^{2} (5,261 sq mi)	490/km^{2} (1,300/sq mi)

== Economy ==
Flanders is home to a diversified modern economy, with emphasis put on research and development. Many enterprises work closely with local knowledge and research centres to develop new products and services. The Gross domestic product (GDP) of the region was €270 billion in 2018, accounting for 59% of Belgium's economic output. GDP per capita adjusted for purchasing power was €36,300 or 136% of the EU27 average in the same year.

=== Transport ===
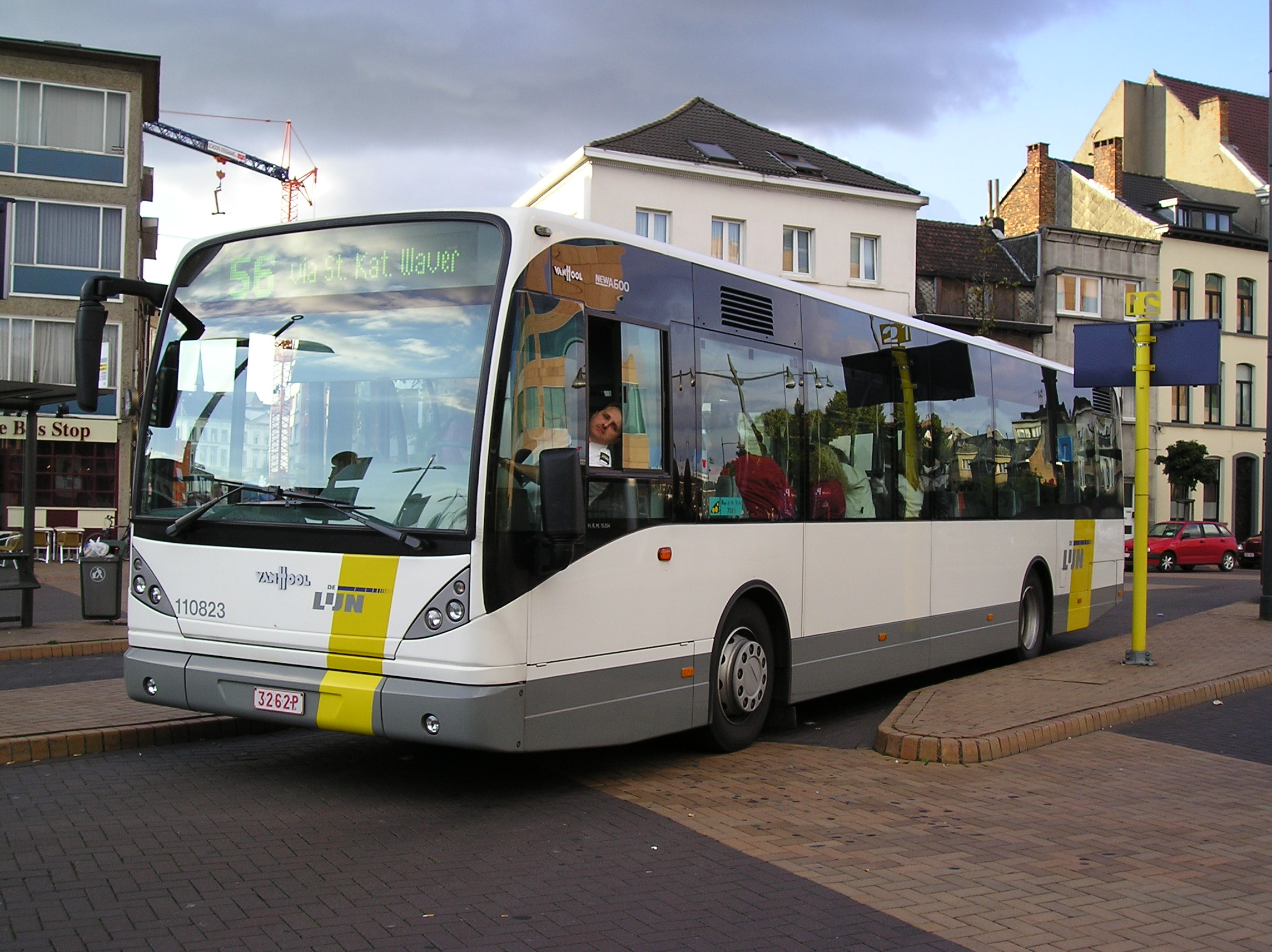
Bus of "De Lijn"

"De Lijn" serves as the main public transport company, run by the Flemish government. It consists of buses and trams. TEC is the equivalent company in Wallonia, and MIVB-STIB in Brussels. The railway network run by the NMBS, however, is a federal responsibility.

The Flemish government is also responsible for all the highways (900 kilometers) and the 500 kilometers of other regional roads (Dutch: gewestwegen) in the territory of the region. Other types of roads are municipal roads.

The network of the Flemish cycle highways, some continuing into Brussels and Wallonia.

The network of bicycle highways (Dutch: fietssnelweg) in Flanders is being expanded under the responsibility of the provinces. Combined with the Brussels Region, this network has 2,700 kilometres of bicycle highways.

The region is served by these airports:

- Brussels Airport
- Antwerp International Airport
- Ostend–Bruges International Airport

== Demographics ==
=== Cities ===
Largest cities in the region include (with population figures as of 1 January 2018):

- Antwerp (523,248)
- Ghent (260,341)
- Bruges (118,284)
- Leuven (101,396)
- Mechelen (86,304)
- Aalst (85,715)
- Hasselt (77,651)
- Sint-Niklaas (76,756)
- Kortrijk (76,265)
- Ostend (71,332)
- Genk (66,110)
- Roeselare (62,301)

The Flemish Diamond (Dutch: Vlaamse Ruit) is the name of the central, populous area in Flanders and consists of several of these cities, such as Antwerp, Ghent, Leuven and Mechelen. Approximately 5.5 million people live in the area.

=== Language ===
The official language of the Flemish Region is Dutch. The dialect cluster spoken in the region is sometimes colloquially referred to as Flemish (Vlaams), Flemish Dutch (Vlaams-Nederlands), Belgian Dutch (Belgisch-Nederlands), or Southern Dutch (Zuid-Nederlands). Spelling and grammar are regulated by a single authority, the Dutch Language Union (Nederlandse Taalunie), comprising a committee of ministers of the Flemish and Dutch governments, their advisory council of appointed experts, a controlling commission of 22 parliamentarians, and a secretariat. The term Flemish can be applied to the Dutch spoken in Flanders; it shows many regional and local variations. The main dialect groups include West Flemish, East Flemish, Brabantian and Limburgish.

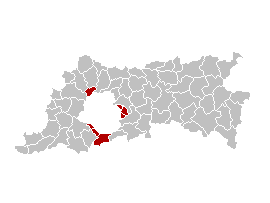
The municipalities with language facilities near Brussels

French (specifically Belgian French) may also be used in the Flemish Region for certain administrative purposes in a limited number of the so-called "municipalities with language facilities" around the Brussels-Capital Region and on the border with Wallonia. These "rim municipalities" around Brussels are Drogenbos, Kraainem, Linkebeek, Sint-Genesius-Rode, Wemmel and Wezembeek-Oppem. Brussels was originally a Dutch-speaking city (Brabantian dialect to be exact), but it was francised in the 19th and 20th centuries and is now officially bilingual in French and Dutch (although largely French-speaking in practice). Municipalities with language facilities on the border with Wallonia are Bever (French: Biévène), Herstappe, Mesen (French: Messines), Ronse (French: Renaix), Spiere-Helkijn (French: Espierres-Helchin), and Voeren (French: Fourons).

=== Religion ===
Religion in the Flemish Region in 2016
1. Catholic Church (68.0%)
2. Protestantism (2.00%)
3. Irreligion (26.0%)
4. Islam (2.00%)
5. Other religion (2.00%)

According to a 2016 survey by the Free University of Brussels, 68% of Flemish citizens are Roman Catholic, 2% are Protestant, 26% are irreligious, while 2% have other religions.

== International relations ==
=== Twin regions and sister regions ===
- Aichi, Japan

== See also ==
- Communities, regions and language areas of Belgium
- Count of Flanders
- De Vlaamse Leeuw
- Flanders
- Flemish
- Provinces of Belgium
- Greater Netherlands
  - Hypothetical partition of Belgium
