= Zuhal Demir =

Belgian lawyer and politician

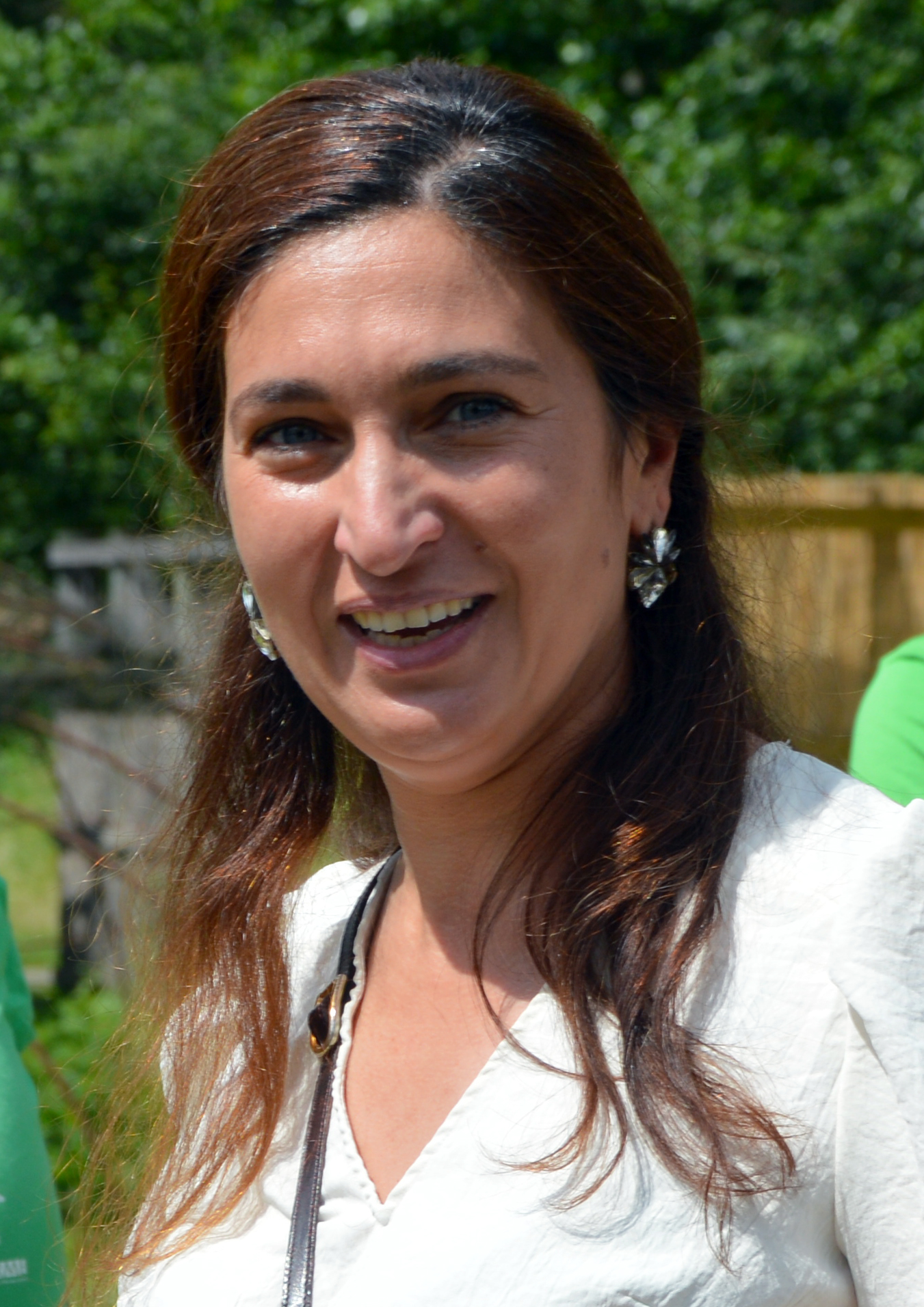

Flemish Minister for Justice and Enforcement, Environment, Energy and Tourism
- Incumbent
- Assumed office 2 October 2019
- Prime Minister: Jan Jambon
- Preceded by: Ben Weyts (as Minister of Tourism)

Secretary of State for Poverty Reduction, Equal Opportunities, People with Disabilities, Urban Policy and Scientific Policy
- In office 24 February 2017 – 9 December 2018
- Preceded by: Elke Sleurs
- Succeeded by: Wouter Beke (as Minister of Consumer Affairs, Disabled Persons, Economy, Employment, Equal Rights and Fighting Poverty)

Member of the Chamber of Representatives
- In office 20 July 2010 – 24 February 2017

Personal details
- Born: 2 March 1980 (age 46) Genk, Limburg, Belgium
- Citizenship: Belgium; Turkey (until 2017)
- Party: New Flemish Alliance
- Children: 1
- Website: www.n-va.be/cv/zuhal-demir

Zuhal Demir (born 2 March 1980) is a Belgian lawyer and politician affiliated with the N-VA. Demir was elected as a member of the Belgian Chamber of Representatives in 2010 and served there until 2017. She served as Secretary of State for Poverty Reduction in the Belgian Government (2017–2018). She then served as the Flemish minister for Justice and Enforcement, Environment, Energy and Tourism in the Jambon Government. In September 2024 she was sworn in as Flemish minister for Education in the Diependaele Government.

== Biography ==
Demir was born in Genk. She is the daughter of Alevi Kurdish parents from Dersim, Turkey and lives in Antwerp. Her father moved to Belgium to work as a miner in the 1970s. She studied law at KU Leuven in 1998–2003, and went on in 2003–2004 with a Master in Social Law at the VUB (Vrije Universiteit Brussel). Since 2004, she has worked as a lawyer for an international law firm focusing on employment law. Demir held dual Belgian and Turkish citizenship but renounced the latter following her election to parliament.

She is married to Flemish businessman Jeroen Overmeer, who was previously a municipal councilor for the N-VA. They have a daughter born in 2017.

== Political career ==
Demir was elected to the Chamber of Representatives during the 2010 Belgian federal election for the N-VA on the Antwerp constituency list.

From January 2013 until the end of 2015, she was the mayor of the district of Antwerp. In early 2016, she resigned from the position after moving back to Genk following the birth of her first child.

In February 2017, she succeeded Elke Sleurs as Secretary of State for Poverty Reduction, Equal Opportunities, People with Disabilities, Urban Policy and Scientific Policy. She has also chaired the Flemish government's integration strategy.

Demir has been given the nickname 'Iron Lady', partly because demir is the Turkish word for iron, and partly due to her advocacy for limiting the duration of unemployment benefits to encourage people back to work.

In 2015 she caused minor controversy for doing a photoshoot for the erotic magazine P-Magazine in parliament.

During the 2019 Belgian regional elections she headed the N-VA's list in the Limburg region for the Flemish Parliament. She was elected and later appointed by Flemish minister Jan Jambon to serve as minister for Tourism and the Environment.

== Beliefs and political work ==
Demir supports compulsory learning of Dutch for people of immigrant backgrounds, stating that her parents spoke limited Dutch when arriving in Belgium but learning the language helped them to become part of Flemish society. She argues "language is the basis for integration.” She has argued that the current Belgian model of social integration has deteriorated. She has voiced opposition to Belgian politicians of Turkish descent performing military service in Turkey, arguing that it implies split loyalties and is a potential security risk, and believes politicians in ministerial posts should not hold multiple citizenships. She has described herself as "100 percent Flemish with Kurdish roots.".

In 2016, she participated in the television documentary Back to their own country with other well-known Belgian politicians and celebrities in which the group travelled with journalist Martin Heylen to conflict areas and followed the refugee route to Europe. Following her participation, she urged Europe to persuade Syrians not to come and for tougher action against human traffickers. She argued "The refugees are received in inhumane conditions, I would also leave in their place. Only, I am concerned about the preservation of our social security system. What are we going to do with all those newcomers when there are already so many unemployed people who do speak Dutch?” She has argued that refugees are better supported in their own region as opposed to coming to Belgium, where she states there are limited employment and integration structures.

In 2017, she was accused by the Turkish press of supporting terrorism and of being a member of the banned Kurdistan Workers' Party (PKK).

Demir has received death threats as a result of her opposition to Turkey's treatment of its Kurdish population. In 2017 a man was sentenced to 6 months in prison for making threats against her. On 6 December 2018, the correctional court of Hasselt sentenced a man from Beringen with a fine of 400 Euros for threatening Zuhal Demir on Facebook. In May 2019, campaign posters for Demir in Maasmechelen were daubed with graffiti of swastikas and the logo of the extreme-right Turkish nationalist Grey Wolves organization. Demir responded that she would not be "intimidated" by the stunt. In November 2020, Demir received death and rape threats via email after she wrote a Facebook post criticising Diyanet (Directorate of Religious Affairs) funding and training of imams in mosques in Belgium. Demir described the Turkish Diyanet directorate as "Erdogan's long arm" and "the antennae of the Erdogan regime." Similar threats were also made against Flemish Vlaams Belang politician Chris Janssens. Demir was subsequently given police protection and surveillance at her home.

== Orders and decorations ==
- 2019: Commander of the Order of Leopold II.
