= VVB =

VVB has more meanings:

- Vereinsbank Victoria Bauspar
- Vorstenlandsche Voetbal Bond
- Vlaamse Volksbeweging
- Vereinigungen Volkseigener Betriebe
