= Lorin Parys =

Belgian lawyer and politician (born 1976)

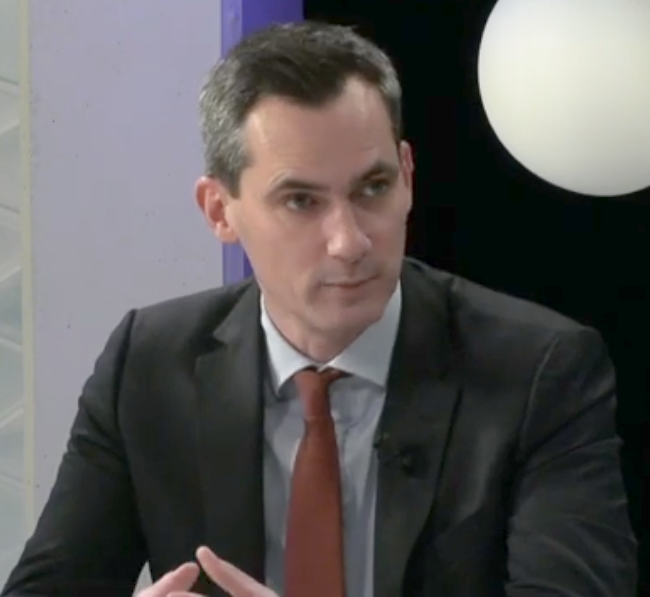
- In a 2019 debate

Member of the Flemish Parliament
- Incumbent
- Assumed office 2014

Vice-chairman of the N-VA
- Incumbent
- Assumed office 2018
- Preceded by: Cieltje Van Achter

Personal details
- Born: 12 April 1976 (age 50) Leuven, Belgium
- Party: N-VA (2013-); Open VLD (2010-2013)

Lorin Parys (born 1976) is a Belgian politician and lawyer affiliated to the New Flemish Alliance party.

== Biography ==
Parys studied law at the University of Namur, KU Leuven, followed by Stellenbosch University in South Africa and the New York University School of Law. He then worked for a legal company in New York City.

After returning to Belgium, he started his political career with the Open VLD and was in second place on the Open VLD list for the House of Representatives in the 2010 elections, but was not elected. In December 2013, he switched parties to the N-VA. In the 2019 Belgian regional elections, he was elected on the N-VA's list to the Flemish Parliament representing the Flemish Brabant constituency. In parliament, he has focused on policy related to the COVID-19 pandemic. In 2021, he was elected vice-chairman of the N-VA along with Valerie Van Peel but later stepped down from the role and suspended political duties after accepting a job in the private sector.
