= Jan Jambon =

Belgian politician

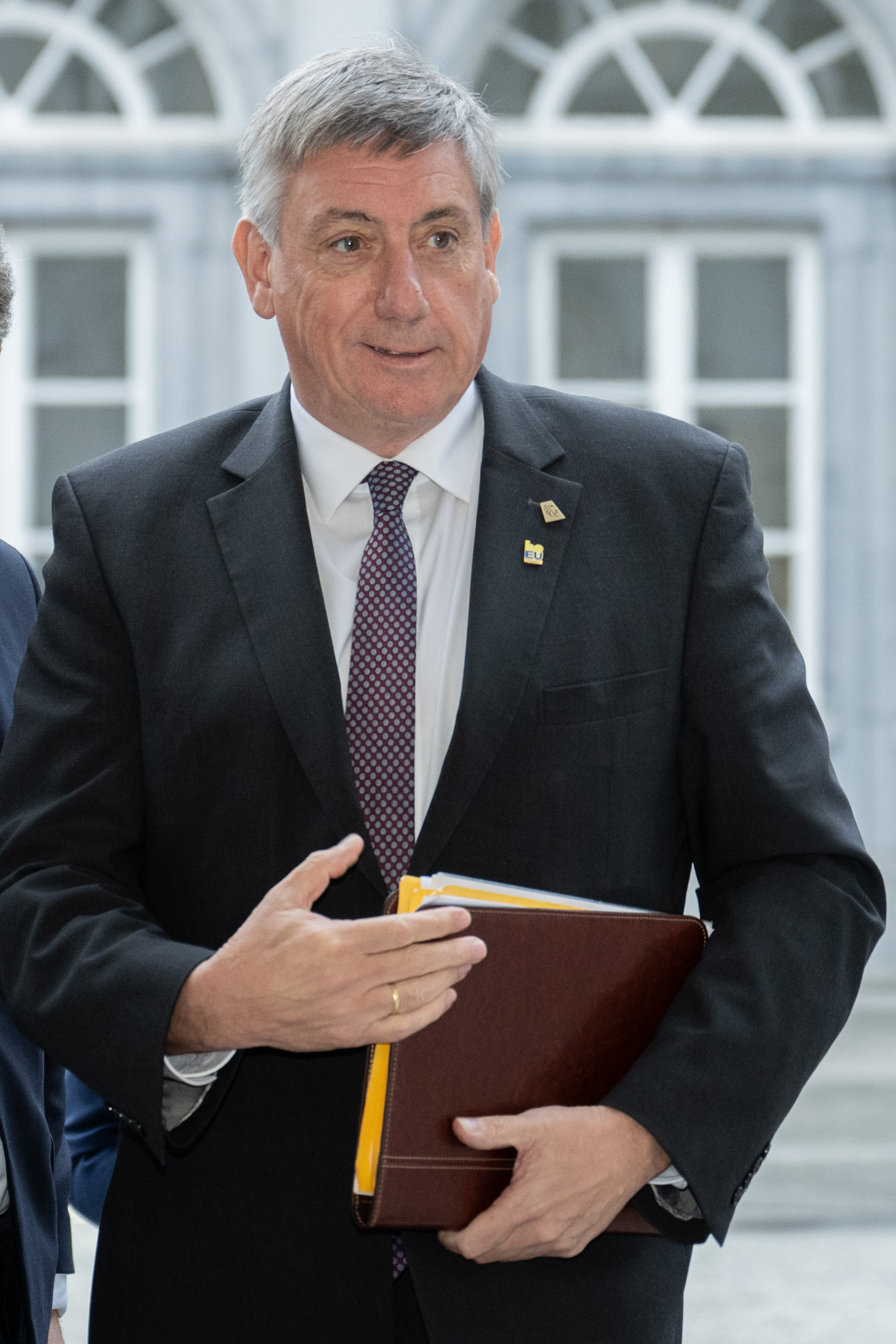
- Jambon in 2024

Deputy Prime Minister of Belgium
- Incumbent
- Assumed office 3 February 2025
- Prime Minister: Bart De Wever
- In office 11 October 2014 – 9 December 2018
- Prime Minister: Charles Michel

Minister of Finance
- Incumbent
- Assumed office 3 February 2025
- Prime Minister: Bart De Wever
- Preceded by: Vincent Van Peteghem

Member of the Flemish Parliament
- In office 2 July 2024 – 3 February 2025
- Constituency: Antwerp Province

Minister-President of Flanders
- In office 2 October 2019 – 30 September 2024
- Deputy: Serving concurrently: Hilde Crevits; Bart Somers; Ben Weyts
- Preceded by: Liesbeth Homans
- Succeeded by: Matthias Diependaele

Minister of the Interior
- In office 11 October 2014 – 9 December 2018
- Prime Minister: Charles Michel
- Preceded by: Melchior Wathelet Jr.
- Succeeded by: Pieter De Crem

Mayor of Brasschaat
- Incumbent
- Assumed office 1 January 2013
- Preceded by: Dirk de Kort

Member of the Chamber of Representatives
- In office 9 December 2018 – 2 October 2019
- Constituency: Antwerp
- In office 28 June 2007 – 11 October 2014
- Constituency: Antwerp

Personal details
- Born: Johan Martin Jozef Jambon; 26 April 1960 (age 66) Genk, Belgium
- Party: New Flemish Alliance (2005–present)
- Other political affiliations: People's Union (until 1988)
- Children: 4
- Education: Vrije Universiteit Brussel; University of Antwerp (MBA)
- Website: Party website

Johan "Jan" Martin Jozef Jambon (born 26 April 1960) is a Belgian businessman and politician of the New Flemish Alliance (N-VA) who has been serving as a Deputy Prime Minister and as the Minister of Finance, Pensions, National Lottery and Federal Culture Institutions in the De Wever Government since February 2025. Before that, he served as Minister-President of Flanders from 2019 to 2024. He replaced Kris Peeters as a member of the Belgian Chamber of Representatives in 2007. The N-VA was, at that time, partnered with the Christian-Democratic and Flemish party. In June 2010 and May 2014, he was re-elected on an N-VA list.

He became mayor of Brasschaat in 2013 after his party won the local elections in 2012. In November 2014, he was replaced as acting mayor by Koen Verberck (also N-VA), after joining the new Federal Government.

In October 2014, he became Deputy Prime Minister and Minister of the Interior and Security, charged with the administration of public buildings, in the Michel Government. Jambon remained in this position until the government fell in December 2018.

In 2019, he became the new Flemish Minister-President of the Jambon government. He is also the mayor of the municipality of Brasschaat. Jambon stepped down as Minister-President with the formation of the Diependaele Government, following the 2024 regional election.

== Early life and career ==
Jan Jambon was born in Genk in April 1960. He received his secondary education at the Catholic Sint-Jan Berchmanscollege in Genk. He then pursued a degree in computer science at the Vrije Universiteit Brussel, followed by a Master of Business Administration (MBA) at the University of Antwerp.

Between 1984 and 1992, Jambon worked as an account manager at IBM. From 1993 to 1996, he served as administrative manager of the Team SD Worx–Protime professional cycling team. He later joined the media group Corelio (now part of Mediahuis), publisher of De Standaard, Het Nieuwsblad, and Het Volk, where he held the positions of regional director and head of customer service in Antwerp.

In 2002, he transitioned to the financial sector, becoming general manager of the Bank Card Company, the issuer of VISA and MasterCard credit cards in Belgium.

== Engagement in the Flemish Movement ==
Jan Jambon began his political career with the Volksunie Youth (VUJO) in Limburg, the youth chapter of the Flemish nationalist Volksunie. From 1985 to 1988, he was a member of the main board of the national Volksunie Youth and chief editor of the monthly magazine WIJ-Jongeren. He belonged to the "right wing" and more Flemish nationalist orientated faction of the party. Their position on the placement of nuclear weapons was diametrically opposed to the official VU party position. Jambon left the party behind in 1988, when nothing came of the so-called Third Phase of state reform. The broadening operation led by Hugo Schiltz and Jaak Gabriëls also proved difficult for him to digest, as did the election of the 'left-wing' member of parliament Herman Lauwers, national chairman of the VVKSM Scouts from Brasschaat. As a result, he left the party in 1988 after the broadening operation wanted by Hugo Schiltz and Jaak Gabriëls, and moved with Peter De Roover to the advocacy group Vlaamse Volksbeweging (VVB).

Jambon is believed to have helped in establishing a chapter of the far-right Flemish nationalist political party Vlaams Blok in the city of Brasschaat in the late 1980s along with Luc Sevenhans. In a source of retrospective debate, Janbon is said to have founded the branch on the advice of Vlaams Blok politician Gerolf Annemans after he and Sevenhans both left the Volksunie. Janbon was reportedly active in branch, but remained behind the scenes to not jeopardize his professional career. However, leading VB politician Filip Dewinter has said he could not confirm whether Janbon actually became a member of the party while Annemans claims never to have seen Janbon at any local meetings for the VB in Brasschaat. In a 2020 interview with de Zontag Janbon denied ever being involved in the Vlaams Blok and claimed the accusation arose misleading due to misleading Wikipedia edits on his page and that he refused any collaboration with the party at the time. However, Sevenhans (who subsequently joined the N-VA) stuck to his story and has argued that Janbon was active within the VB at a local level.

In the mid-1990s, Jambon tried together with Peter De Roover to influence the political character of the annual IJzerbedevaart in Diksmuide. He founded, among others with Lieven Van Gerven, then chairman of the Davidsfonds, the IJzerbedevaart Forum. This forum died a quiet death in 1996 after the much more radical Werkgroep Radicalisering IJzerbedevaart, consisting of Voorpost, VNJ, NSV and others, then started the current IJzerwake in Steenstrate and Ypres.

In 1992, he co-authored the book Vlaanderen staat in Europa with Peter de Roover and became a member of the pro-independence think tank In de Warande.

From 1992, he was for many years chairman of the Overlegcentrum van Vlaamse Verenigingen and also a national board member of the Vlaamse Volksbeweging, where he was elected treasurer in October 1998 and subsequently became political and administrative secretary. Since 1991 he has been a board member of the Algemeen Nederlands Zangverbond (General Dutch Singing Association).

For several years he was chairman of the Overlegcentrum van Vlaamse Verenigingen (think tank of Flemish associations) and a member of the leadership of the Vlaamse Volksbeweging (Flemish People's Movement), a separatist movement demanding Flemish independence, of which he was elected treasurer in October 1998 before becoming administrative and political secretary.

== Political career ==
On 18 February 2006, Jambon resigned from the Vlaamse Volksbeweging to work for the New Flemish Alliance (N-VA) in order to prepare the partition of Belgium.

On 8 December 2005, Jambon founded a branch of the N-VA in the Antwerp town of Brasschaat. At the municipal elections on 8 October 2006, Jambon received 565 preferential votes and from January 2007 he was alderman for finance and local economy. In mid-March 2007, he stood as a candidate in Antwerp on the list of N-VA and CD&V for the federal parliamentary elections, where he obtained 9,099 preferential votes.

On 28 June 2007, he became a member of parliament in the Belgian Chamber of Representatives, succeeding Kris Peeters on the CD&V/N-VA cartel list. After the vote on the split of the electoral district of Brussels-Halle-Vilvoorde on 7 November 2007 Jambon declared that the N-VA would not step into an orange-blue emergency cabinet if there was no prospect of state reform. In the elections of 13 June 2010 and of 25 May 2014, he was re-elected respectively as list leader and list duper of the Antwerp N-VA Chamber list. In the Chamber, he was N-VA group leader from 2008 to 2014.

Within the walls of the parliament, Jambon founded a "Diamond Club". Jan Jambon became chairman, Willem-Frederik Schiltz from Open Vld and Servais Verherstraeten from CD&V became vice-chairmen. Their intention was to represent the interests of the diamond sector at parliamentary level. It was remarkable that people's representatives so openly called for the interests of one business sector to be defended in an 'informal club'.

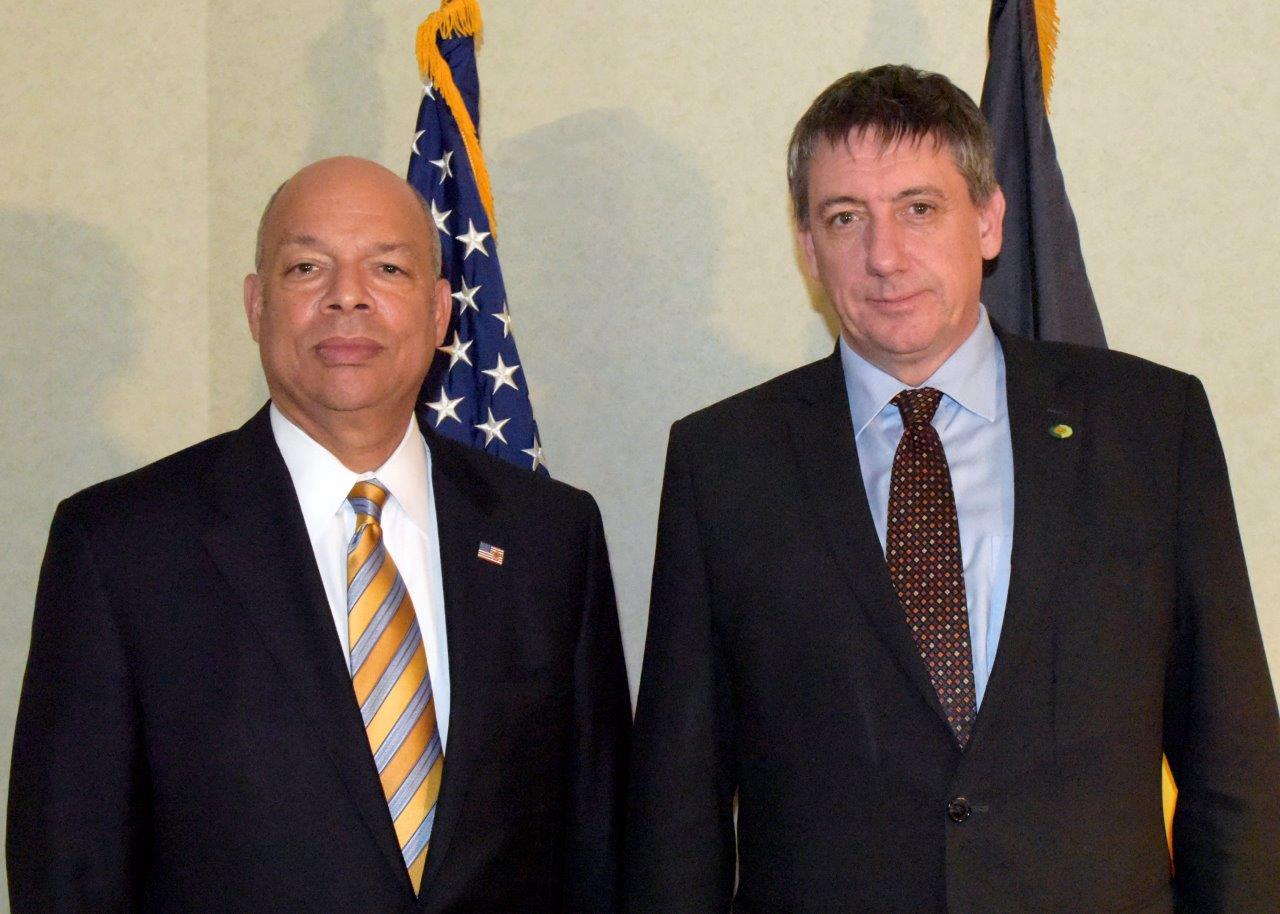
Jambon meets with U.S. Secretary of Homeland Security Jeh Johnson in Washington, D.C., on 1 April 2016.

In the 2012 provincial council elections, Jambon was the last one on the list in the canton of Antwerp in the municipality of Brasschaat, where the N-VA obtained 39 percent of the votes. He then became mayor of the municipality on 1 January 2013. In the municipal elections of 2018, N-VA obtained an absolute majority in the municipal council of Brasschaat with 44 percent, allowing him to remain mayor.

In 2014, he was included in the Michel I government, where he became Deputy Prime Minister and Minister of Security and the Interior. Koen Verberck became serving mayor of Brasschaat, Jambon however remained titular mayor.

After the attacks in Brussels on 22 March 2016, Jambon and Minister of Justice Koen Geens offered their resignations, but this was refused by Prime Minister Charles Michel.

With the governmental crisis surrounding the UN migration treaty, the Michel I government fell and Jambon's ministerial mandate came to an end on 9 December 2018. He then became a member of parliament again and resumed his role as mayor from 2019, which was the first time that he had been elected to the post of mayor.

In the 2019 federal elections, he was N-VA list leader in the constituency of Antwerp. He was re-elected to the Chamber with 187,826 preferential votes and was active there until early October 2019. On 12 August 2019, it was announced that he would lead the negotiations for the formation of a new Flemish Government. Jambon thereby took the place of his party leader Bart De Wever, who was a candidate for prime minister during the election campaign. The Jambon government was finally formed in early October with Jambon as prime minister. He also became responsible for Culture, Foreign Policy and Development Cooperation.

== Controversies ==
After the 22 March 2016 attacks, Jambon, as Minister of the Interior, claimed in an interview with De Standaard that "a significant part of the Muslim community danced in response to the attacks." For this, he could not provide concrete indications of partying Muslims, but referred to information from the National Security Council showing that the incidents that occurred were marginal and did not involve a significant part of the Muslim community.

=== Case-Chovanec ===
In August 2020, Jambon came under scrutiny for allegedly failing to act as interior minister in 2018 following an incident in Charleroi airport. In that incident, a Slovak man, Jozef Chovanec, was killed in a police cell after an intervention by the aviation police (part of the federal police). Two and a half years after the incident, surveillance footage of the police action surfaced, causing a social outcry. In a meeting with the Parliamentary Committees on Justice and Home Affairs, Interior Minister Pieter De Crem indicated that Jambon was aware of the incident at the time, which he would have previously denied. Jambon claimed after De Crem's revelation that he had no recollection of it and that the file shows that neither he nor his cabinet had found out that the police had acted in a problematic manner.

=== Birthday of Sint-Maartensfonds ===
Representing the Flemish People's Movement, Jambon spoke on 5 May 2001 at the 50th Anniversary Celebration of the Flemish Eastern Front Community Sint-Maartensfonds v.z.w., a former organization of Flemish former volunteers of the Flemish Legion and the Waffen-SS. Jan Jambon was later criticized for making a speech.

This was brought out for the first time in 2007 by Karel De Gucht on VRT, in an election debate with Yves Leterme, who was then working with CD&V and N-VA. The fact was brought out a second time on 23 October 2013 by the far-right New-Solidarist Alternative, but this time with photo material. The VRT program Terzake devoted extra attention to the case on 24 October 2013 and the news was taken up by the main Flemish media, in De Tijd and De Standaard Avond, the online evening edition of De Standaard, which devoted its front page to it on 25 October 2013. Then-Flemish minister Johan Sauwens had to resign in May 2001 after it was revealed that he had participated in the same meeting.

In 2014, three days after his appointment as federal minister, he gave an interview to the French-language newspapers La Libre Belgique and La Dernière Heure, where he sought to justify his presence at the anniversary of the Sint-Maartensfonds. During the interview he called the collaboration a mistake, saying the following: "It's easy to talk in retrospect. The people who collaborated with the Germans had their reasons. I did not live in that period." This statement was criticized by several Belgian politicians, as well as the Social-Democrat Group Leader in the European Parliament, Gianni Pittella.

By press release to the Belga agency, Jan Jambon apologized.

Political offices
Preceded by Melchior Wathelet Jr.	Minister of the Interior; 2014–2018	Succeeded by Pieter De Crem
Preceded by Liesbeth Homans	Minister-President of Flanders; 2019–2024	Succeeded by Matthias Diependaele
