= Homans Government =

- Cabinet of Flanders
- Incumbent
- Date formed: 2 July 2019
- Date dissolved: 2 October 2019

People and organisations
- Head of state: Philippe of Belgium
- Head of government: Liesbeth Homans
- No. of ministers: 8
- Member party: N-VA; CD&V; Open Vld
- Status in legislature: Coalition

History
- Predecessor: Bourgeois
- Successor: Jambon

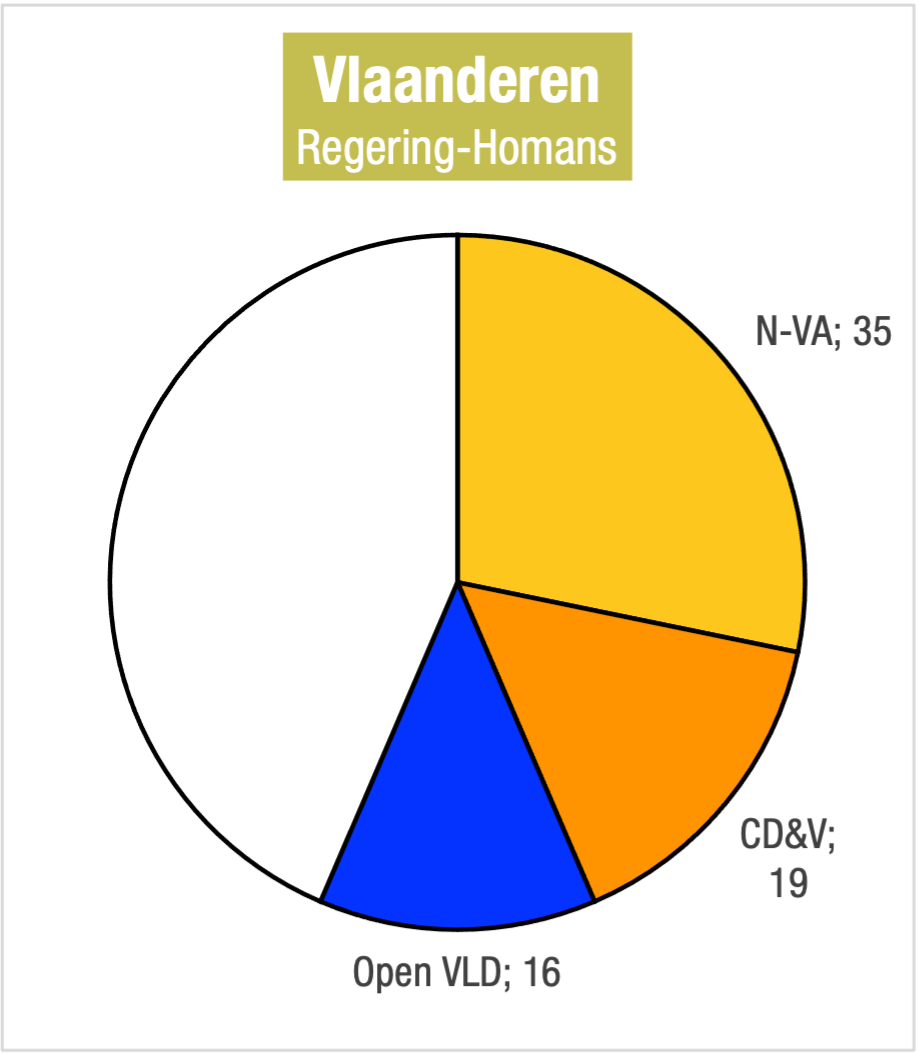
Parliamentary majority

The Homans Government (Regering-Homans) was the interim Flemish Government formed and sworn in on 2 July 2019, following the departure of Flemish Minister-President Geert Bourgeois who took up his seat in the European Parliament following the 2019 European Parliament election in Belgium. It was replaced by the Jambon Government on 2 October 2019.

With Bourgeois leaving and no new coalition agreement yet having been found following the 2019 Belgian regional elections, the interim Homans government was formed as a continuation of the Bourgeois Government, consisting of the same centre-right coalition of the nationalist New Flemish Alliance (N-VA), the Christian Democratic and Flemish party (CD&V) and the Open Flemish Liberals and Democrats (Open Vld), but now led by Liesbeth Homans, who became the first female minister-president of Flanders.

The cabinet had a small majority in the Flemish Parliament as they dropped from 89 to 70 seats since the previous election, needing 63 for a majority. The main opposition parties were far-right Vlaams Belang (VB), the Green party and the Socialist Party (sp.a).

On 30 September 2019, the three parties announced that they had come to a new coalition agreement to form a new government which would start governing from 2 October 2019, thereby replacing the interim Homans Government.

== Composition ==
The Homans Government consisted of eight ministers, which was one less than the previous government as the N-VA has shifted the various functions over one less minister. Homans took over the role of minister-president from Geert Bourgeois and Ben Weyts became the new vice minister-president, taking over Bourgeois' ministerial duties of Foreign Policy and Immovable Heritage on top of his duties as Flemish Minister for Mobility and Public Works, the Brussels Periphery, Tourism and Animal Welfare.

The coalition was a continuation of the Bourgeois Government, consisting of the N-VA (35 seats), CD&V (19 seats) and Open Vld (16 seats).

Flemish Government - Homans 2019 (Jul-Oct)
Party	Name	Function
N-VA	Liesbeth Homans	Minister-President of the Flemish Government and Flemish Minister for Public Governance, Civic Integration, Housing, Equal Opportunities and Poverty Reduction
CD&V	Hilde Crevits	Vice minister-president of the Flemish Government and Flemish Minister for Education
Open Vld	Sven Gatz (until July 18, 2019)	Vice minister-president of the Flemish Government and Flemish Minister for Media, Culture, Youth and Brussels
Open Vld	Lydia Peeters (from July 18, 2019)	Vice minister-president of the Flemish Government and Flemish Minister for Finance, Budget, Energy, Media, Culture and Youth
N-VA	Ben Weyts	Vice minister-president of the Flemish Government and Flemish Minister for Mobility and Public Works, the Brussels Periphery, Tourism, Animal Welfare, Foreign Policy and Immovable Heritage
CD&V	Jo Vandeurzen	Flemish Minister for Welfare, Public Health and Family
Open Vld	Lydia Peeters (until July 18, 2019)	Flemish Minister for Finance, Budget and Energy
Open Vld	Sven Gatz (from July 18, 2019)	Flemish Minister for Brussels
N-VA	Philippe Muyters	Flemish Minister for Work, Economy, Innovation, Scientific Policy and Sport
CD&V	Koen Van den Heuvel	Flemish Minister for Town and Country Planning, Environment and Nature

=== Changes ===
- On 18 July 2019 the new government of the Brussels-Capital Region was sworn in, including Sven Gatz. As a result, Gatz' duties in the Flemish government were reduced and shifted to Lydia Peeters. Peeters became vice-minister president for Open Vld and took over the functions of Flemish Minister for Media, Culture and Youth, leaving Gatz only with the Brussels portfolio.
