= Björn Anseeuw =

Belgian politician (born 1976)

Bjorn Anseeuw
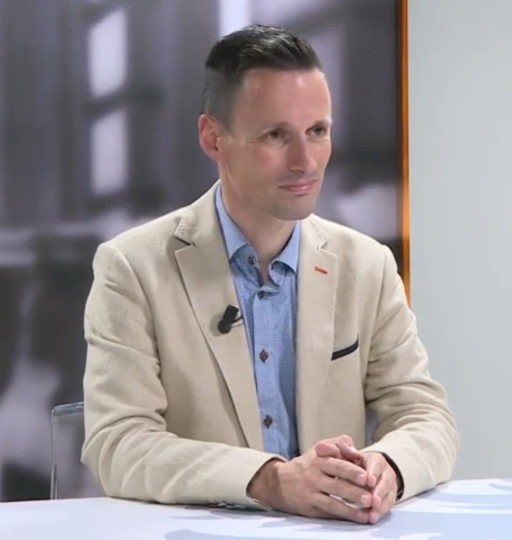

Member of the Chamber of Representatives
- Incumbent
- Assumed office 26 May 2019

Member of the Flemish Parliament
- In office 2014–2019

Personal details
- Born: 17 October 1976 (age 49) Ostend
- Party: N-VA (2001-); Volksunie (before 2001)

Björn Anseeuw (born 17 September 1976) is a Belgian politician and a member of the Member of the Chamber of Representatives for the Flemish nationalist New Flemish Alliance (N-VA) party.

== Biography ==
Anseeuw was born in Ostend and grew up in Gistel. His father was a local politician in Gistel for the Volksunie (VU) and later the N-VA. Anseeuw was a member of the VU's youth wing. He studied nursing at the Katholieke Hogeschool Vives Noord and worked as a psychiatric nurse. He was also a parliamentary assistant to N-VA politician Nadia Sminate.

In the municipal elections of 2012, Anseeuw was elected as a councilor in Ostend for the N-VA. In June 2014, he was elected to the Flemish Parliament where he sat on the committees for public health and Housing, Poverty Policy and Equal Opportunities. In 2019, he left the Flemish Parliament after being elected to the Chamber of Representatives for the West Flanders constituency. In parliament, he serves on the Social Affairs Committee.
