= Minister-President of Flanders =

Head of the Flemish Government

- Minister-president van Vlaanderen
- Coat of arms of Flanders

- Flag of Flanders

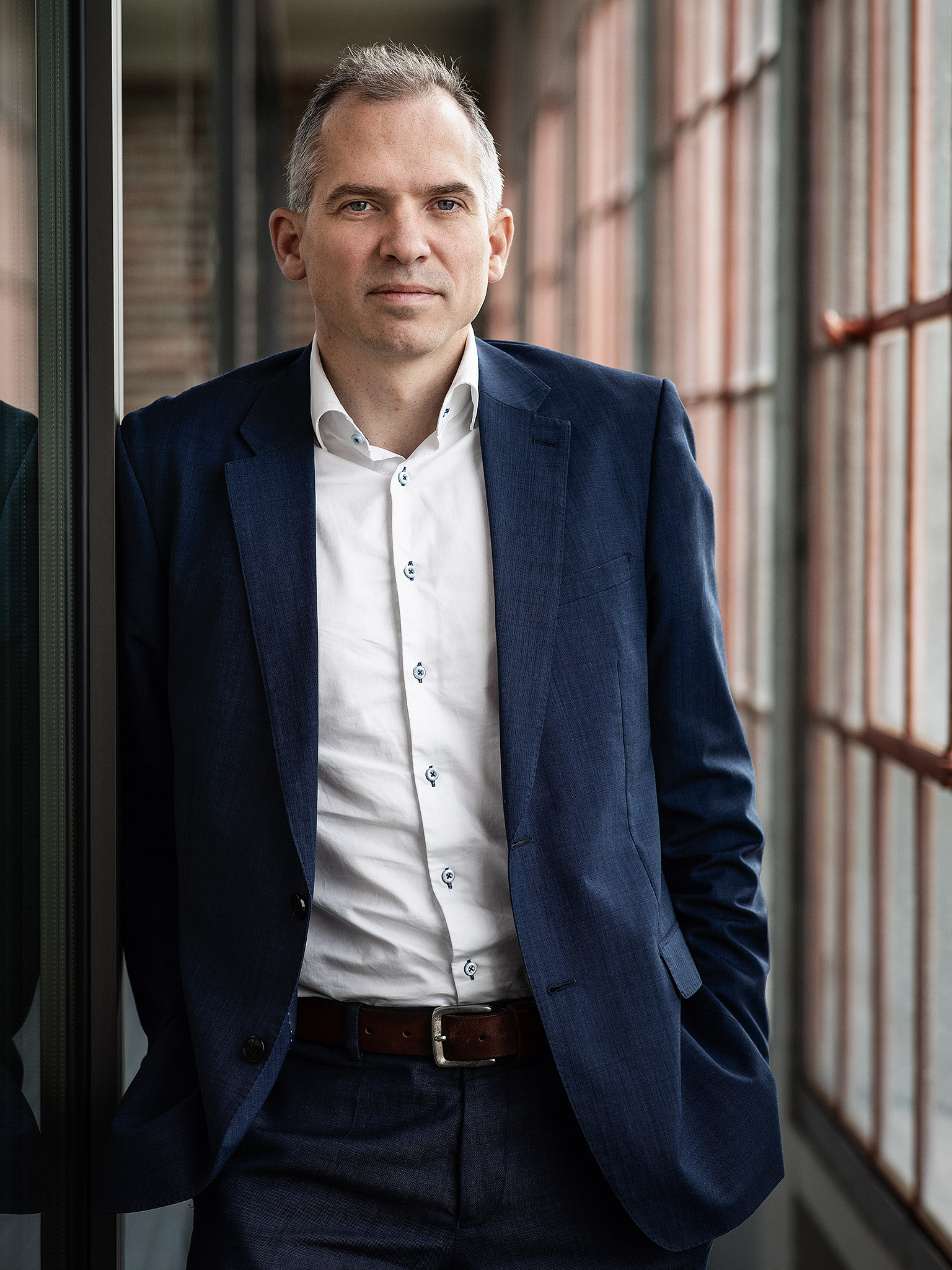
- Incumbent; Matthias Diependaele since 30 September 2024
- Executive branch of the Flemish Government
- Member of: Flemish Government
- Residence: Errera House; Koningsstraat 14; Brussels, Belgium
- Seat: Martyrs' Square 19; Brussels, Belgium
- Appointer: King of the Belgians
- Term length: Five years
- Constituting instrument: Constitution of Belgium
- Precursor: President of the Flemish Executive
- Inaugural holder: Gaston Geens
- Formation: 22 December 1981
- Deputy: Hilde Crevits; Bart Somers; Ben Weyts
- Salary: €253,000 annually
- Website: http://www.flanders.be/

The minister-president of Flanders (Dutch: Minister-president van Vlaanderen) is the head of the Flemish Government, which is the executive branch of the Flemish Region and Community.

The incumbent officeholder is Matthias Diependaele, who took over from Jan Jambon, following the 2024 Belgian regional elections. The current government is made up of three parties, the New Flemish Alliance (N-VA), Vooruit, and Christian Democratic and Flemish (CD&V). The ministers were sworn in on 30 September 2024. The government consists of nine ministers, five for the N-VA, two for Vooruit and two for CD&V.

== Appointment ==
Following the election of the Flemish Parliament, a Flemish Government is formed with a maximum of eleven ministers. The largest party in the government coalition may choose the minister-president. Following the oath of office of all ministers before the Flemish Parliament, the minister-president alone takes the oath of office before the King as well.

Regional elections are held every 5 years. The Flemish Parliament was elected directly for the first time in 1995. Prior to 1995, the members of the Flemish Parliament were the members of the Dutch language group of the Federal Parliament of Belgium.

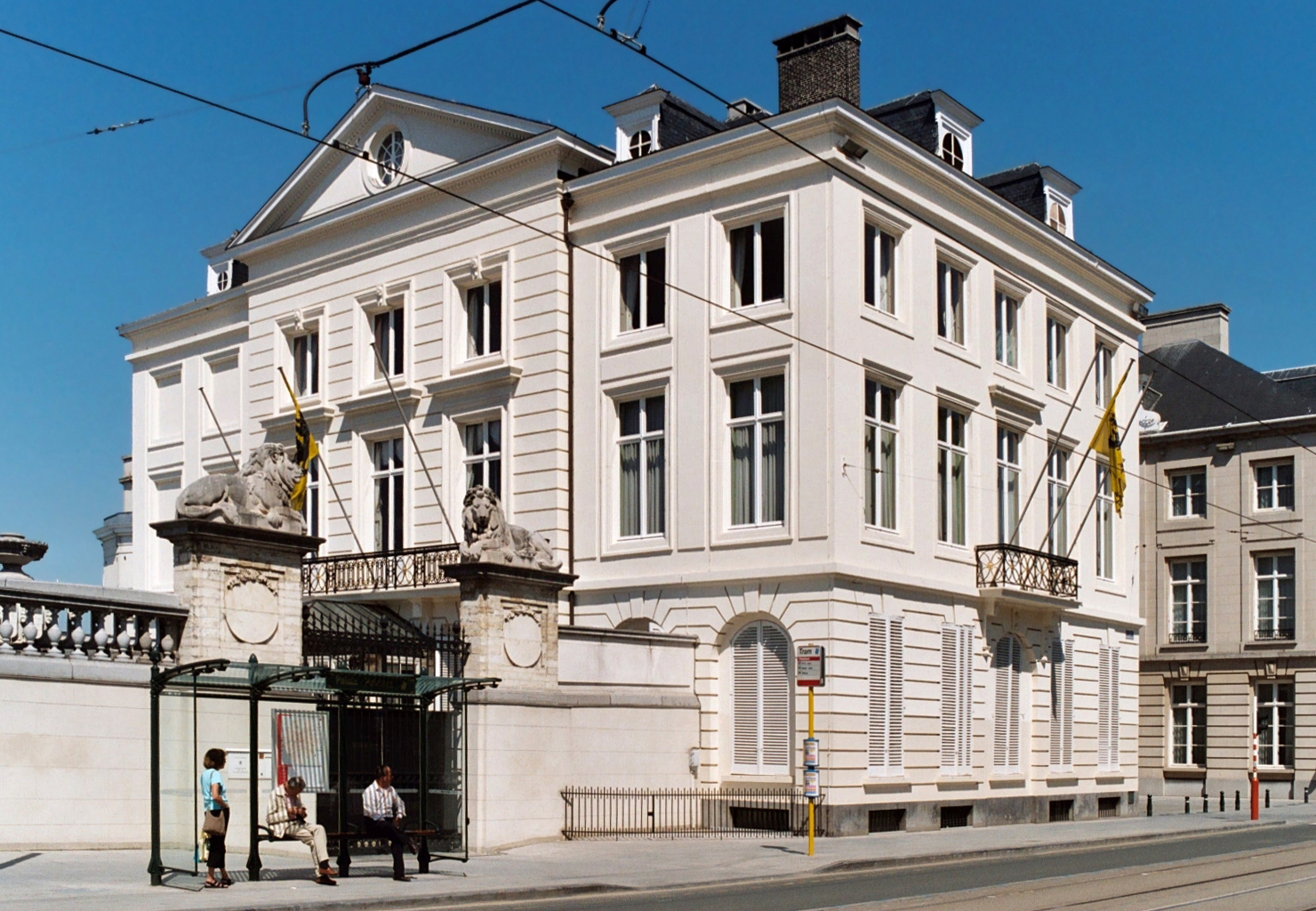
The Errera House, the official residence of the Minister-President of Flanders and his ministers

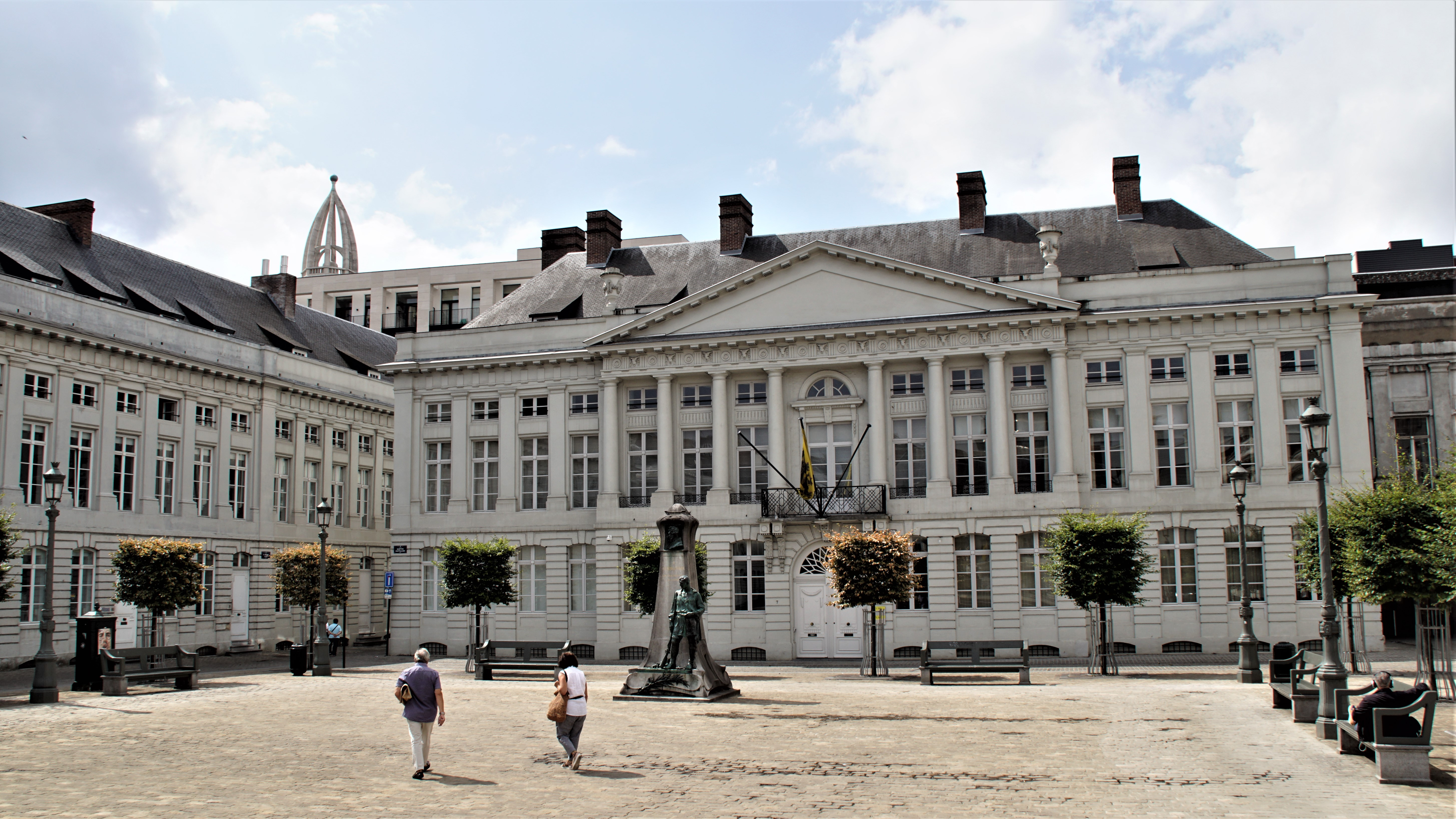
The cabinet offices are located at the Place des Martyrs/Martelaarsplein in Brussels

== List of officeholders ==
No.	Portrait	Name (Birth–Death)	Elected	Term of office			Political Party	Government	
No.	Portrait	Name (Birth–Death)	Elected	Took office	Left office	Time in office	Political Party	Government	
1		Gaston Geens (1931–2002)	1981	22 December 1981	21 January 1992	10 years 30 days	CVP	Geens I	CVP, PVV, SP, VU
1		Gaston Geens (1931–2002)	1985	22 December 1981	21 January 1992	10 years 30 days	CVP	Geens II	CVP, PVV
1		Gaston Geens (1931–2002)	1987	22 December 1981	21 January 1992	10 years 30 days	CVP	Geens III	CVP, PVV
1		Gaston Geens (1931–2002)	1987	22 December 1981	21 January 1992	10 years 30 days	CVP	Geens IV	CVP, SP, PVV, VU
2		Luc Van den Brande (born 1945)	1991	21 January 1992	13 July 1999	7 years, 174 days	CVP	Van den Brande I	CVP, SP
2		Luc Van den Brande (born 1945)	1991	21 January 1992	13 July 1999	7 years, 174 days	CVP	Van den Brande II	CVP, SP, VU
2		Luc Van den Brande (born 1945)	1991	21 January 1992	13 July 1999	7 years, 174 days	CVP	Van den Brande III	CVP, SP, VU
2		Luc Van den Brande (born 1945)	1995	21 January 1992	13 July 1999	7 years, 174 days	CVP	Van den Brande IV	CVP, SP
3		Patrick Dewael (born 1955)	1999	13 July 1999	5 June 2003	3 years, 327 days	VLD	Dewael	VLD, SP, Agalev, VU-ID
4		Bart Somers (born 1964)	—	11 June 2003	20 July 2004	1 year, 39 days	VLD	Somers	VLD, sp.a, Groen!, Spirit
5		Yves Leterme (born 1960)	2004	20 July 2004	28 June 2007	2 years, 342 days	CD&V	Leterme	CD&V, sp.a-Spirit, VLD-Vivant, N-VA
6		Kris Peeters (born 1962)	—	28 June 2007	25 July 2014	7 years, 27 days	CD&V	Peeters I	CD&V, sp.a-Spirit, VLD, N-VA
6		Kris Peeters (born 1962)	2009	28 June 2007	25 July 2014	7 years, 27 days	CD&V	Peeters II	CD&V, sp.a, N-VA
7		Geert Bourgeois (born 1951)	2014	25 July 2014	1 July 2019	4 years, 350 days	N-VA	Bourgeois	N-VA, CD&V, Open Vld
8		Liesbeth Homans (born 1973)	—	2 July 2019	1 October 2019	91 days	N-VA	Homans	N-VA, CD&V, Open Vld
9		Jan Jambon (born 1960)	2019	2 October 2019	29 September 2024	4 years, 363 days	N-VA	Jambon	N-VA, CD&V, Open Vld
10		Matthias Diependaele (born 1979)	2024	30 September 2024	Incumbent	1 year, 343 days	N-VA	Diependaele	N-VA, Vooruit, CD&V

== See also ==
- Prime Minister of Belgium
- Minister-President of the Brussels Capital-Region
- Minister-President of the French Community
- Minister-President of the German-speaking Community
- Minister-President of Wallonia
- Politics of Flanders
- Flemish Parliament
- Flemish Government
