= Renew Europe in the European Committee of the Regions =

Renew Europe
- President: (Republic of Ireland) Gillian Coughlan
- Headquarters: Brussels
- Ideology: Liberalism; Centrism
- International affiliation: Alliance of Liberals and Democrats for Europe Party

Website
- https://www.reneweurope-cor.eu

Renew Europe is a political group in the European Committee of the Regions, bringing together liberal and democrat city mayors, regional presidents and ministers, and local and regional councillors to contribute to the European Union's legislative procedure. The group is the successor to the Alliance of Liberals and Democrats for Europe in the European Committee of the Regions (ALDE-CoR) which existed from 2004 to 2019, which in turn succeeded the ELDR-CoR group which had existed since 1998. The group consists of members from several European political parties, including Alliance of Liberals and Democrats for Europe and the European Democratic Party. The Renew Europe group in the European Committee of the Regions is the sister group of the Renew Europe political group in the European Parliament.

== History ==
In 1998 political groups were established in the European Committee of the Regions, and as a result the liberal and democrat members formed the group of the European Liberal Democrat and Reform Party (European Parliament group). In 2004 the group was renamed to the Alliance of Liberals and Democrats for Europe Party (ALDE) reflecting a similar change in the group in the European Parliament and incorporating new members along with the change. In 2019 the group was renamed to Renew Europe following the change in the group in the European Parliament.

In 2016, Bart Somers, Mayor of Mechelen and leader of the liberal group in the Flemish Parliament, was elected as the new President of Renew Europe (former ALDE-CoR) by the group. He served as president until the end of the European Committee of the Regions mandate (2020). In 2020, François Decoster was elected as the new President of Renew Europe CoR. Decoster, currently Mayor of Saint-Omer, France, and President of the Hauts-de-France regional government, is no stranger to the European Committee of the Regions and European politics. In January 2025, Decoster was re-elected President of the Renew Europe Group in the European Committee of the Regions. In October 2026, Gillian Coughlan was elected as President of Renew Europe CoR.

The list of Renew Europe presidents:

No.	Tenure	Name	Member state	Group Name
1	1998-2002	Graham Tope	United Kingdom	ELDR
2	2002-2006	Kent Johansson	Sweden	ELDR / ALDE
3	2006-2008	Ivo Opstelten	Netherlands	ALDE
4	2008-2012	Flo Clucas	United Kingdom	ALDE
5	2012-2016	Bas Verkerk	Netherlands	ALDE
6	2016 – 2020	Bart Somers	Belgium	ALDE / Renew Europe
7	2020–2025	François Decoster	France	Renew Europe
8	2025 - 2026	François Decoster	France	Renew Europe
9	2026 - present	Gillian Coughlan	Ireland	ALDE

== Renew Europe Bureau ==
The Renew Europe Bureau consists of the Presidency, Chairs, Vice-Chairs of CoR Commissions belonging to the Renew Europe Group as well as four elected members. The Bureau is primarily tasked with preparation of meetings of the CoR Bureau as well as the subsequent Renew Europe meetings. The Bureau meets the day before each plenary session of the CoR.

The list of the Renew Europe Bureau for the 2025 - 2030 CoR mandate:

Title	Name	Member state
President	Gillian Coughlan	Ireland
First Vice-president	Karīna Mikelsone	Latvia
Second Vice-president	Willy Borsus	Belgium
Third Vice-president	Mirja Vehkapera	Finland
Bureau Member	Arthur van Dijk	Netherlands
Bureau Member	Jozef Viskupič	Slovakia
Bureau Member	Hanne Roed	Denmark
Bureau Member	Tsvetelina Simeonova - Zarkin	Bulgaria
Ex-officio Bureau Member	Gunars Ansins	Latvia
Ex-officio Bureau Member	Ivan Gulam	Croatia
Ex-officio Bureau Member	Magali Altounian	France
