= Liesbeth Homans =

Flemish politician (born 1973)

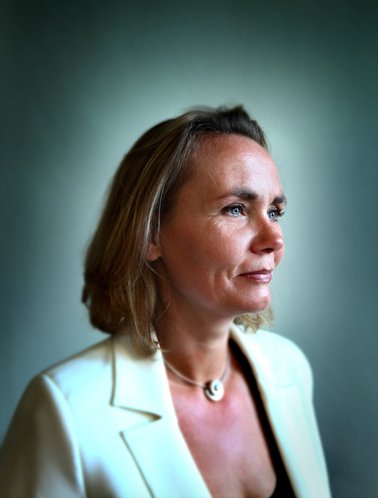
- Liesbeth Homans in 2013

Speaker of the Flemish Parliament
- In office 2 October 2019 – 8 January 2025
- Preceded by: Wilfried Vandaele
- Succeeded by: Freya Van den Bossche

Minister-president of Flanders
- In office 2 July 2019 – 2 October 2019
- Monarch: Philippe
- Preceded by: Geert Bourgeois
- Succeeded by: Jan Jambon

Vice Minister-President of Flanders
- In office 25 July 2014 – 2 October 2019
- Prime Minister: Geert Bourgeois; Herself
- Preceded by: Geert Bourgeois
- Succeeded by: Bart Somers

Member of the Belgian Senate
- In office 13 July 2010 – 14 October 2012

Member of the Flemish Parliament
- Incumbent
- Assumed office 2 October 2019
- In office 7 June 2009 – 23 July 2014

Personal details
- Born: 17 February 1973 (age 53) Antwerp, Belgium
- Party: N-VA (2001–present)
- Other political affiliations: People's Union (until 2001)
- Children: 2
- Website: http://www.n-va.be/cv/liesbeth-homans

Liesbeth Homans (born 17 February 1973) is a Belgian politician and is affiliated to New Flemish Alliance. She was elected as a member of the Flemish Parliament in 2009 and as a member of the Belgian Senate in 2010. She has served as Minister-president of Flanders and Speaker of the Flemish Parliament since 2019.

== Biography ==
Homans was born in 1973 in Wilrijk. She graduated in 1998 as a licentiate (master's degree) in history at the Catholic University of Leuven and obtained a degree in international politics at the University of Antwerp. During her student days she was active in the Katholiek Vlaams Hoogstudentenverbond (KVHV) group where she met future N-VA leader Bart De Wever. After being active in the Flemish nationalist People's Union party she was a founding member of the N-VA in 2001. She was chairwoman of the Openbaar centrum voor maatschappelijk welzijn (Public Centre for Social Welfare) in Antwerp from 2013 until July 2014, when she became a member of the Bourgeois Government as Flemish Minister for Local Government, Poverty Reduction, Housing, Civic Integration, Equal Opportunities, Cities and Social Economy.

In July 2019 she became the first female Minister-President of Flanders in succession of Geert Bourgeois as he became member of the European parliament. The Homans Government was however only an intermediate government in attendance of a new Flemish government and was replaced in October 2019 by the Jambon Government. On 2 October 2019 she became Speaker of the Flemish Parliament.

== Controversies ==
On 2 July 2019, when a picture was being taken following her oath of office, she said "we do not want this rag in the background", in reference to the Belgian flag.

Political offices
Preceded by Geert Bourgeois	Minister-President of Flanders; 2019	Succeeded by Jan Jambon
