= Matthias Diependaele =

Flemish politician

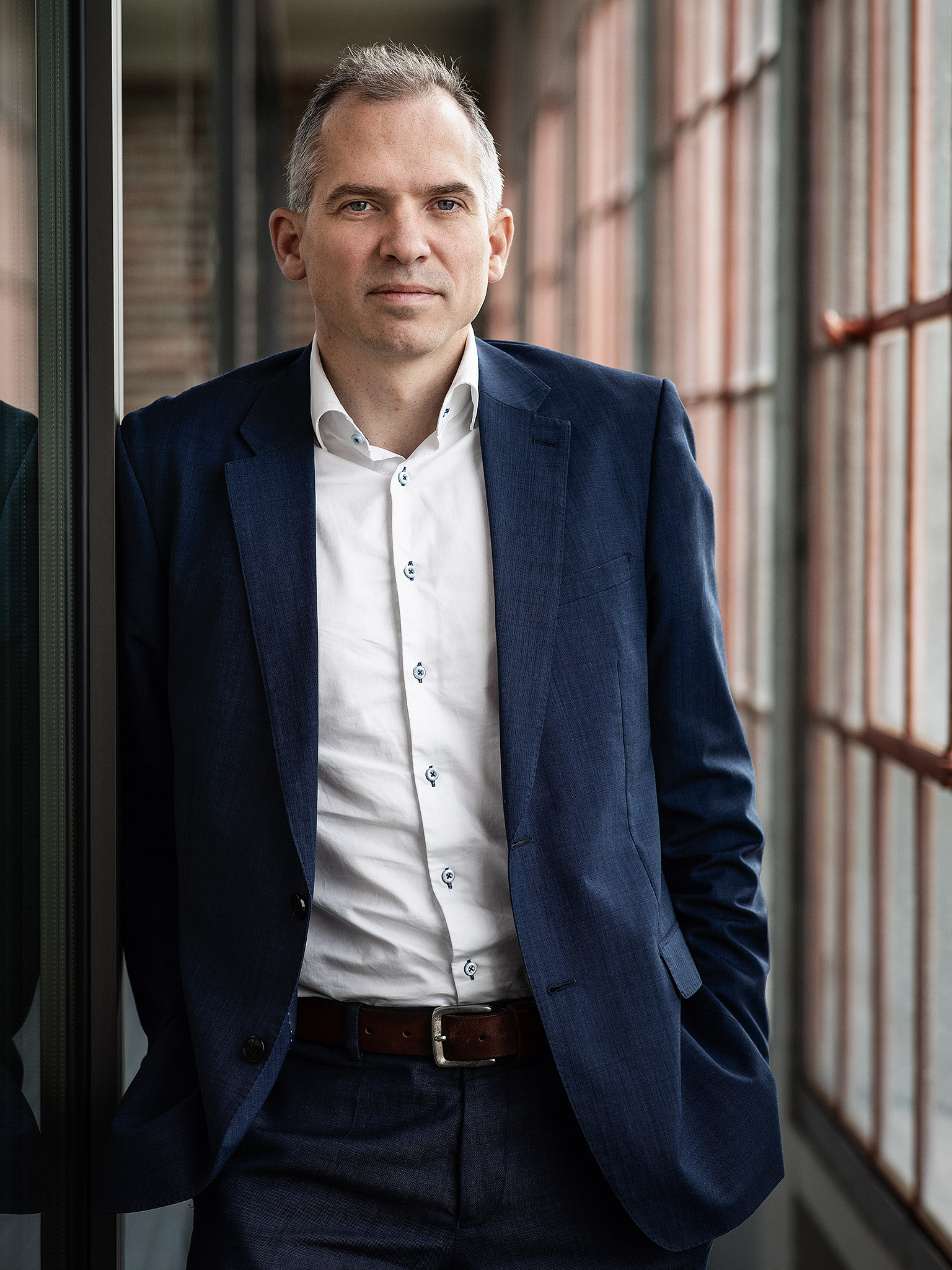
- Diependaele in 2019

Minister-President of Flanders
- Incumbent
- Assumed office 30 September 2024
- Deputy: Serving concurrently: Ben Weyts; Melissa Depraetere; Hilde Crevits
- Preceded by: Jan Jambon

Flemish Minister for Finance, Budget, Housing and Immovable Heritage
- In office 2 November 2019 – 30 September 2024
- Preceded by: Lydia Peeters
- Succeeded by: Ben Weyts

Member of the Flemish Parliament
- In office 7 June 2009 – 1 October 2019

Personal details
- Born: 7 August 1979 (age 46) Sint-Niklaas, East Flanders, Belgium
- Party: N-VA
- Website: http://www.n-va.be/cv/matthias-diependaele

Matthias Diependaele (born 7 August 1979 in Sint-Niklaas) is a Belgian politician affiliated to the New Flemish Alliance (N-VA) who is the current Minister-President of Flanders, having taken office in 2024. He additionally serves as the Flemish Minister for Economy, Innovation en Industry, External Affairs, Digitalisation, and Facility Management.

He previously served as the Flemish Minister for Finance, Budget, Housing and Immovable Heritage in the Jambon Government, and as a member of the Flemish Parliament between 2009 and 2019.

== Career ==
In 2006, he graduated with a law degree from the KU Leuven, having specialized himself in European and international law. He started his political career within the N-VA as a parliamentary aide to MEP Frieda Brepoels. In the 2009 regional elections, at the age of 29, he was elected as a member of the Flemish parliament. In 2013, Diependaele became the parliamentary leader for the N-VA in the Flemish parliament, succeeding Kris Van Dijck.

In the 2012 local elections, Diependaele was the lead candidate for the N-VA-ZAP list in his home town Zottegem and was elected as a municipal councillor. Despite his party gaining the largest share of the vote, it was excluded from the governing coalition and ended up in opposition. After the 2018 local elections, the N-VA formed a new coalition with CD&V and Diependaele was appointed as an alderman tasked with traffic, mobility, public works, spatial planning, submunicipalities and animal welfare. As part of the coalition agreement, it was decided that Diependaele would take over as mayor at the start of 2022.

He was reelected as a member of the Flemish parliament in the 2014 and 2019 regional elections. On 2 October 2019, Diependaele became the Minister for Finance, Budget, Housing and Immovable Heritage in the new Jambon Government. As required by law, he resigned from his position as an alderman in Zottegem at the same time. However, he will still take up his mandate as mayor of Zottegem at the start of 2022. He was succeeded as parliamentary leader by Wilfried Vandaele.

Following the June 2024 elections, he led the Flemish government formation. He became Minister-President in the Diependaele Government as of September 2024.
