= Bart Somers =

Flemish politician and mayor of Mechelen

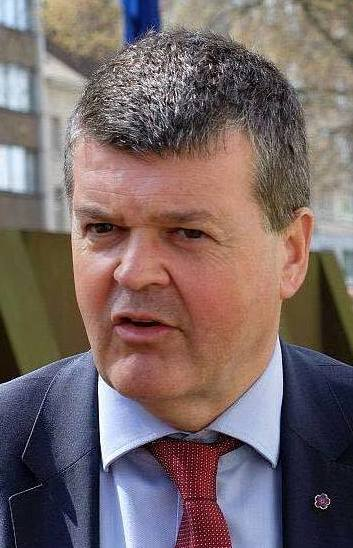
- Somers in 2015

Mayor of Mechelen
- Incumbent
- Assumed office 2001
- Preceded by: Geert Bervoets

Leader of the Open Flemish Liberals and Democrats
- In office 2004–2009
- Preceded by: Dirk Sterckx
- Succeeded by: Guy Verhofstadt

Minister-President of Flanders
- In office 11 June 2003 – 20 July 2004
- Preceded by: Renaat Landuyt (Acting)
- Succeeded by: Yves Leterme

Vice Minister-President of Flanders
- In office 2 October 2019 – 30 September 2024
- Prime Minister: Jan Jambon

Personal details
- Born: 12 May 1964 (age 62) Mechelen, Belgium
- Party: Anders
- Spouse: Miet Bourlon (divorced)
- Children: 2
- Education: Catholic University of Leuven
- Website: Official website

Bartolomeus Jozef Lodewijk Rosalia "Bart" Somers (born 12 May 1964 in Mechelen) is a Belgian, Flemish politician. He is currently the mayor of Mechelen.

In 2017, Bart Somers was awarded 2016 World Mayor Prize as recognition for his outstanding achievements in welcoming refugees during recent years and for the long-term integration of immigrants from different cultures, religions and social backgrounds. He obtained a law degree from the Katholieke Universiteit Leuven.

== Political career ==
Bart Somers is the son of the former People's Union parliamentarian, Joos Somers, who was notably a deputy and a senator. After a law degree at KU Leuven, Bart Somers went through the Volksunie before joining the Open VLD in 1992.

Between 2003 and 2004, he was the Minister-President of Flanders.

After the regional elections of June 2004 he was appointed the interim chairman of the Flemish Liberals and Democrats (VLD). On 4 December 2004, he was elected with just over 50 percent of the vote to a full term as chairman.

Bart Somers was one of the three negotiators for the Open VLD during the 2007 Belgian government formation.

After his party's defeat in the regional elections of 2009, he resigned as chairman of the Flemish Liberals and Democrats.

In June 2016, the European Committee of the Regions adopted Bart Somers report on "Combatting Radicalisation and Violent Extremism: Prevention mechanisms at local and regional level". His opinion won cross-party support for its calls for more effective policing, for more cooperation between local, regional, national and European authorities, and for an approach based on respect for core principles.

In October 2016, Bart Somers was elected as Leader of the Alliance of Liberals and Democrats for Europe in the European Committee of the Regions.

In February 2017, he received the "World Mayor Prize 2016", an election for the year's best mayor in the world.

In October 2019, he became Vice minister-president of the Flemish Government and Flemish Minister for Living Together and Domestic Administration in the Jambon Government. On November 6, 2023, he decided to resume his position and focus on his mayoralty of Mechelen.

== Personal life ==
He was formerly married to Miet Bourlon (currently divorced) and he has two children, a girl Lieze and a boy Jan Klaas.

Political offices
Preceded by Geert Bervoets	Mayor of Mechelen; 2001–present	Incumbent
Preceded by Renaat Landuyt; Acting	Minister-President of Flanders; 2003–2004	Succeeded by Yves Leterme
Preceded by Dirk Sterckx	Leader of the Open Flemish Liberals and Democrats; 2004–2009	Succeeded by Guy Verhofstadt
