= Diependaele Government =

Flemish government formed in 2024

- Cabinet of Flanders
- Incumbent
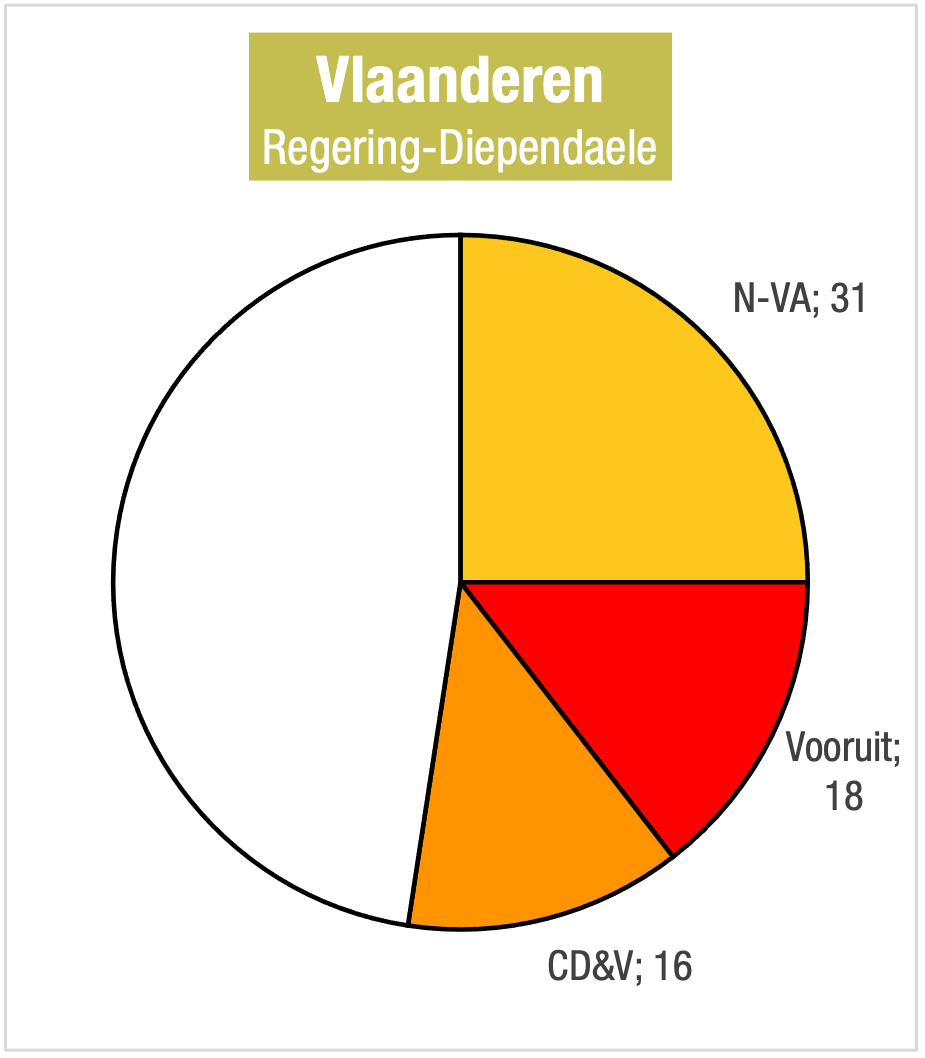
- Date formed: 30 September 2024

People and organisations
- Head of state: Philippe of Belgium
- Head of government: Matthias Diependaele
- No. of ministers: 9
- Member party: N-VA; Vooruit; CD&V
- Status in legislature: Coalition

History
- Predecessor: Jambon

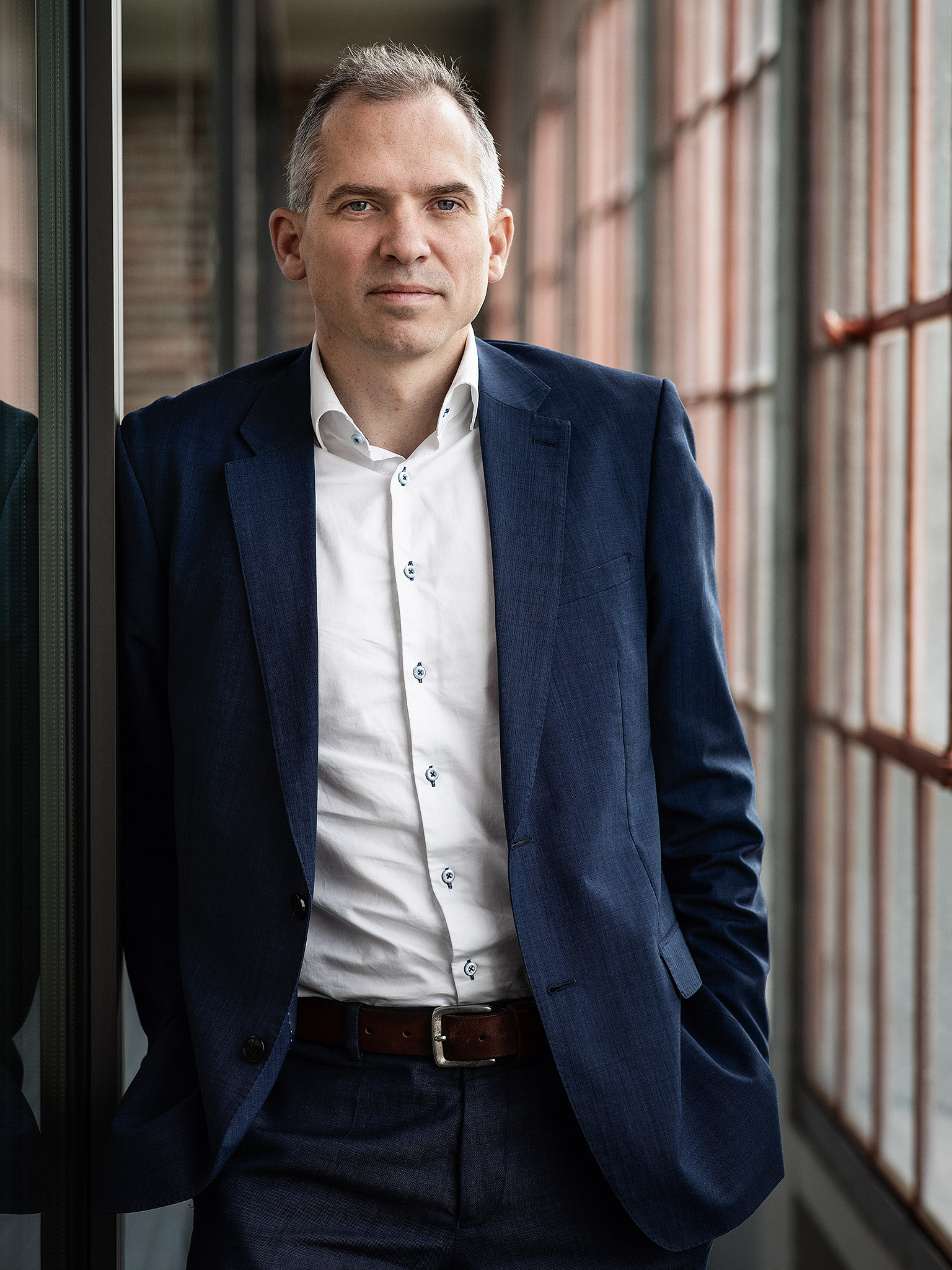
Minister-President Diependaele

The Diependaele Government (Regering-Diependaele) is the Flemish Government formed and sworn in on 30 September 2024, following the 2024 Belgian regional elections and replacing the Jambon Government.

The Government was formed following the 2024 Belgian government formation consisting of parties N-VA, Vooruit and CD&V, making up a majority of 65 seats in the 124 seat Flemish Parliament.

N-VA ministers are Matthias Diependaele, Zuhal Demir, Ben Weyts, Cieltje Van Achter and Annick De Ridder. Vooruit ministers are Caroline Gennez and Melissa Depraetere. CD&V ministers are Hilde Crevits and Jo Brouns. As such, the cabinet is female-dominated, with only 3 male ministers (the minimum 1/3 required).

The main opposition parties are the right-wing Vlaams Belang (VB), the Green party, the Open Flemish Liberals and Democrats (Open Vld), and the Workers' Party (PVDA). Team Fouad Ahidar also holds a single seat in opposition.

== Composition ==
The coalition replaced the Jambon Government following the 2024 Belgian federal election and again consisted of three parties, together having a narrow majority of 65 seats out of 124 seats total. The N-VA (31 seats) and CD&V (16 seats) were already part of the outgoing coalition, with Vooruit (18 seats) now replacing the Open Vld.

- Vice minister-president Melissa Depraetere (Vooruit) took pregnancy leave starting from 21 January 2026 for an estimated period of roughly 6 months, with Hans Bonte taking over her functions during that period. Depraetere eventually returned to office from 29 June 2026.

Flemish Government - Diependaele 2024-current
Party	Name	Function
N-VA	Matthias Diependaele	Minister-President of the Flemish Government and Flemish Minister for Economy, Innovation en Industry, External Affairs, Digitalisation, and Facility Management
N-VA	Ben Weyts	Vice minister-president of the Flemish Government and Flemish Minister for Budget and Finance, Vlaamse Rand, Real Estate Heritage, and Animal Welfare
Vooruit	Melissa Depraetere	Vice minister-president of the Flemish Government and Flemish Minister for Housing, Energy and Climate, Tourism, and Youth
Vooruit	Hans Bonte (from 21 January 2026 until 28 June 2026)	Interim Vice minister-president of the Flemish Government and Flemish Minister for Housing, Energy and Climate, Tourism, and Youth
CD&V	Hilde Crevits	Vice minister-president of the Flemish Government and Flemish Minister of the Interior, Urban and Rural Policy, Society, Integration and Inclusion, Administration, Social Economy, and Marine Fishing
N-VA	Zuhal Demir	Flemish Minister for Education, Justice, and Employment
N-VA	Annick De Ridder	Flemish Minister for Mobility, Public Works, Ports, and Sport
N-VA	Cieltje Van Achter	Flemish Minister for Brussels, and Media
Vooruit	Caroline Gennez	Flemish minister for Welfare and Poverty Alleviation, Culture, and Equal Opportunities
CD&V	Jo Brouns	Flemish Minister for Agriculture and Environment

== Policy ==
The coalition agreement, published on 30 September 2024, is titled "Working together toward a warm and prosperous Flanders" ("Samen werken aan een warm en welvarend Vlaanderen"). A few more concrete measures are:

- More priority is put on knowledge of the Dutch language: parents who refuse to learn Dutch could lose the Flemish school bonus
- Separate religion and ethics classes in state schools (Flemish Community schools) will be replaced with a course on "interphilosophical dialogue"
- The property registration tax for buying a house will be lowered from 3% to 2%.

The total Flemish Government budget is €65 billion annually. The majority is spent on education (€ 19 billion) and welfare (€ 17 billion).
