= Jambon Government =

Flemish Government formed and sworn in on 2 October 2019

- Cabinet of Flanders

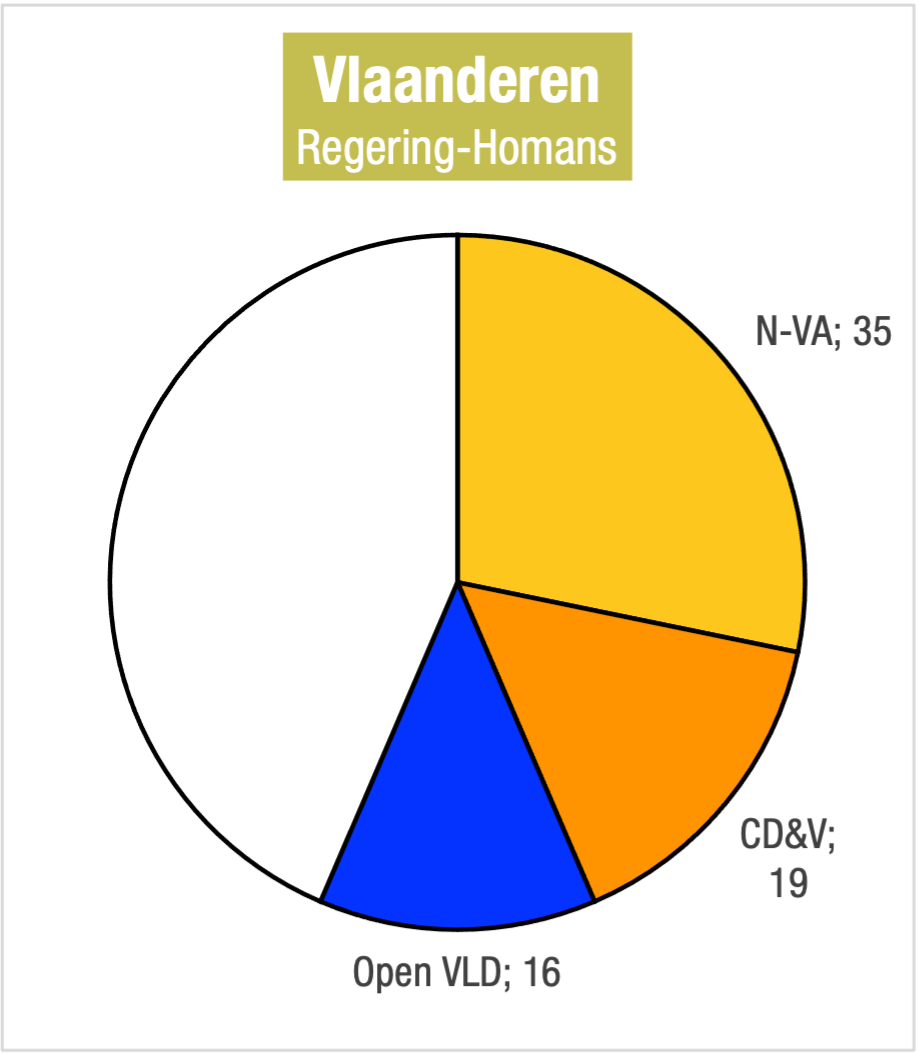
- Date formed: 2 October 2019
- Date dissolved: 30 September 2024

People and organisations
- Head of state: Philippe of Belgium
- Head of government: Jan Jambon
- No. of ministers: 9 (2 October 2019 - 2 August 2024); 8 (2 August 2024 - 30 September 2024)
- Member party: N-VA; CD&V; Open Vld
- Status in legislature: Coalition

History
- Predecessor: Homans
- Successor: Diependaele

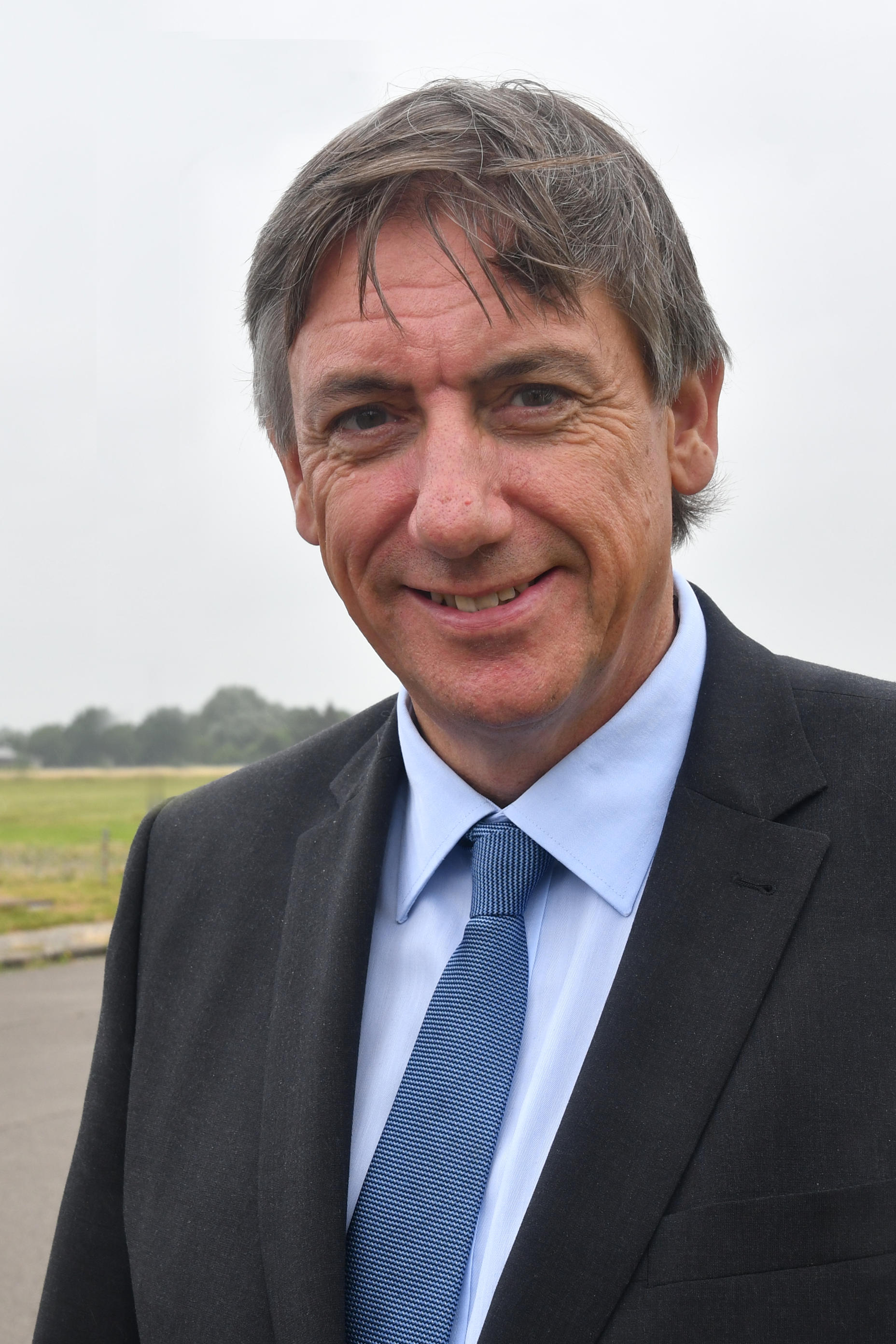
Minister-President Jan Jambon

The Jambon Government (Regering-Jambon) was the Flemish Government formed and sworn in on 2 October 2019, following the 2019 Belgian regional elections and replacing the interim Homans Government. It was replaced by the Diependaele Government on 20 September 2024.

On 30 September 2019, just over four months after the elections, the ruling parties (New Flemish Alliance (N-VA), the Christian Democratic and Flemish party (CD&V) and the Open Flemish Liberals and Democrats (Open Vld)) announced they had agreed to form a new coalition led by Jan Jambon, to be sworn in on 2 October 2019.

The cabinet started with a small majority in the Flemish Parliament as it dropped from 89 to 70 seats since the previous election, needing 63 for a majority. It lost a further seat in April 2021 when Sihame El Kaouakibi left Open Vld and became an independent member of Parliament. The main opposition parties were the far-right Vlaams Belang (VB), the Green party and the Socialist Party (sp.a).

== Composition ==
The coalition replaced the interim Homans Government, again consisting of the N-VA (35 seats), CD&V (19 seats) and Open Vld (16 seats). In contrary to what was expected, the N-VA only has four ministers (instead of five), while CD&V has three (instead of only two). Finally, Open Vld has two ministers, although in the final months of the Government, following the resignation of Gwendolyn Rutten, no new minister was appointed and Open Vld was left with only one minister.

Flemish Government - Jambon 2019-current
| Party | Name | Function |
|---|---|---|
| N-VA | Jan Jambon | Minister-President of the Flemish Government and Flemish Minister for Culture, Foreign Policy and Development Cooperation |
| CD&V | Hilde Crevits (until 17 May 2022) | Vice minister-president of the Flemish Government and Flemish Minister for Economy, Employment, Social Economy, Innovation and Agriculture |
| CD&V | Hilde Crevits (from 18 May 2022) | Vice minister-president of the Flemish Government and Flemish Minister for Welfare, Health and Family |
| Open Vld | Bart Somers (until 6 November 2023) | Vice minister-president of the Flemish Government and Flemish Minister for the Interior, Administrative Affairs, Integration, and Equal Opportunities |
| Open Vld | Gwendolyn Rutten (from 7 November 2023 until 2 August 2024) | Vice minister-president of the Flemish Government and Flemish Minister for the Interior, Administrative Affairs, Integration, and Equal Opportunities |
| N-VA | Ben Weyts | Vice minister-president of the Flemish Government and Flemish Minister for Education, Animal Welfare, Brussels Periphery and Sport |
| N-VA | Zuhal Demir | Flemish Minister for Justice and Enforcement, Environment, Energy and Tourism |
| CD&V | Wouter Beke (until 12 May 2022) | Flemish Minister for Welfare, Health, Family and Poverty Reduction |
| CD&V | Jo Brouns (from 18 May 2022) | Flemish Minister for Economy, Employment, Social Economy, Innovation and Agriculture |
| N-VA | Matthias Diependaele | Flemish Minister for Finance, Budget, Housing and Immovable Heritage |
| Open Vld | Lydia Peeters (until 2 August 2024) | Flemish Minister for Mobility and Public Works |
| Open Vld | Lydia Peeters (from 3 August 2024) | Vice minister-president of the Flemish Government and Flemish Minister for the Interior, Administrative Affairs, Integration, Equal Opportunities, Mobility and Public Works |
| CD&V | Benjamin Dalle | Flemish Minister for Brussels, Media, Youth and Poverty Reduction (Poverty Reduction from 18 May 2022) |

=== Changes ===
- On 12 May 2022 Wouter Beke announced to be resigning from the Flemish Government after suffering months of criticism on his approach towards tackling the corona crisis, the waiting lists in healthcare and the abuses in childcare. Beke returned to take up the position of mayor of Leopoldsburg. A few days later, CD&V announced that his portfolios (Welfare, Health, Family and Poverty Reduction) would be taken over by Hilde Crevits, who would in turn leave her portfolios (Economy, Employment, Social Economy, Innovation and Agriculture) to newcomer Jo Brouns.
- On 6 November 2023 Bart Somers announced to be resigning from the Flemish Government to take up his position as mayor of Mechelen, replacing acting mayor Alexander Vandersmissen. One day later, Gwendolyn Rutten was announced as the successor of Somers.
- On 2 August 2024 Gwendolyn Rutten announced to be resigning from the Flemish Government to take up her position as mayor of Aarschot in preparation for the 2024 Belgian local elections where she aims for reelection. Rutten thereby replaced acting mayor Bert Van der Auwera. With new government negotiations ongoing, it was decided not to replace Rutten in the Flemish Government, but rather shift her duties to Open Vld colleague Lydia Peeters for the remainder of the term.
