= Ben Weyts =

Belgian politician

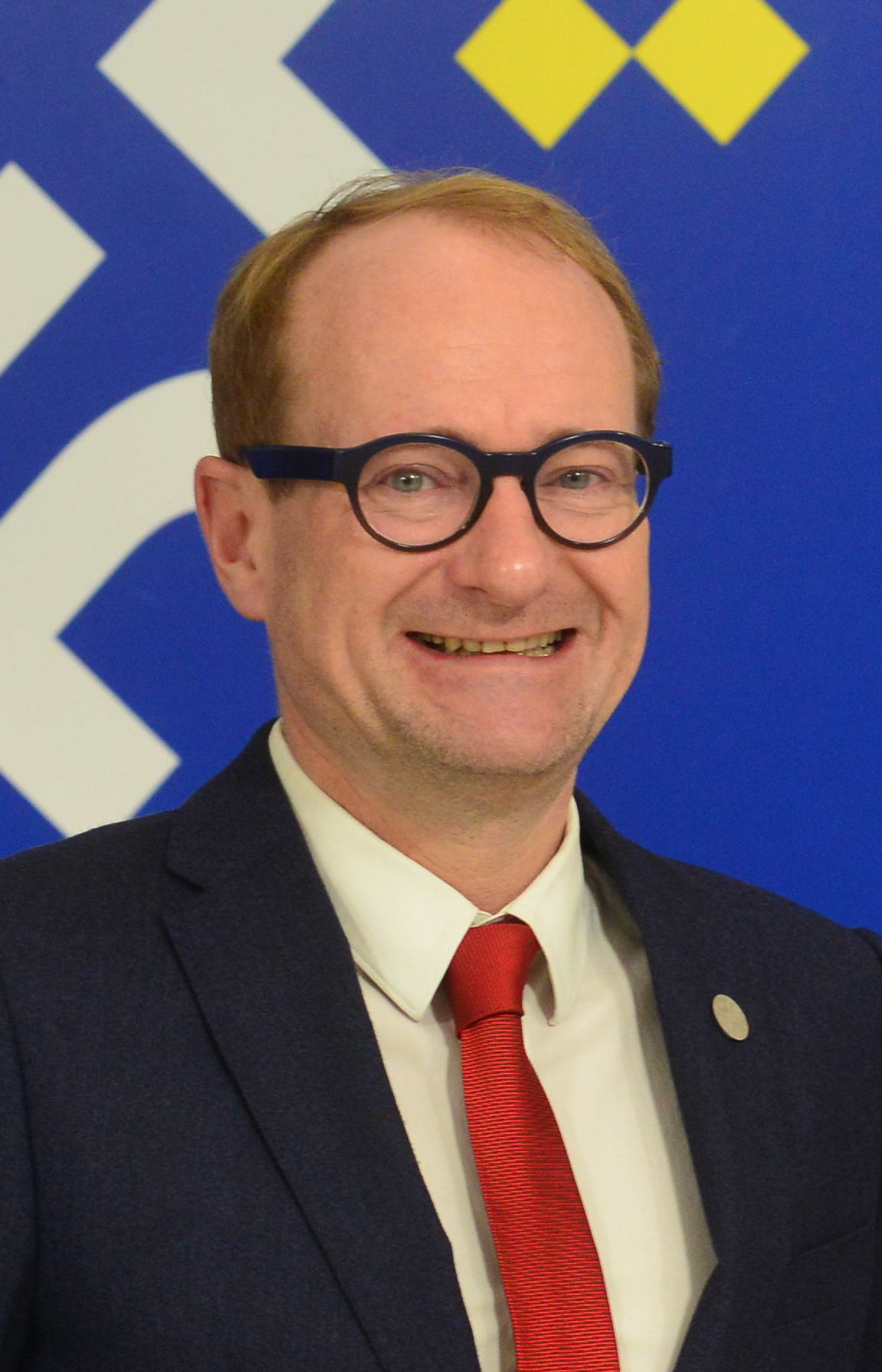
- Weyts in 2018

Vice Minister-President of Flanders
- Incumbent
- Assumed office 2 October 2019 Serving with Melissa Depraetere (from 2024) and Hilde Crevits
- Prime Minister: Jan Jambon; Matthias Diependaele

Member of the Chamber of Representatives
- In office 31 December 2008 – 28 April 2014
- Constituency: Brussels-Halle-Vilvoorde

Flemish ministerial roles
- 2014–2019: Animal Welfare; Brussels Periphery; Mobility; Public Works; Tourism
- 2019: Animal Welfare; Brussels Periphery; Immovable Heritage; Foreign Policy; Mobility; Public Works; Tourism
- 2019–2024: Animal Welfare; Brussels Periphery; Education; Sport
- 2024–: Budget and Finance; Brussels Periphery; Real Estate Heritage; Animal Welfare

Personal details
- Born: 12 November 1970 (age 55) Leuven, Belgium
- Party: People's Union (1999-2001); New Flemish Alliance (2001-present)
- Children: 2
- Education: Ghent University
- Website: Ben Weyts

Ben Weyts (born 12 November 1970) is a Belgian politician of the New Flemish Alliance (N-VA). He has been a Vice Minister-President of Flanders in the Flemish Government since 2019, and serves as the Flemish Minister for Budget and Finance, Brussels Periphery, Real Estate Heritage, and Animal Welfare in the current Diependaele Government, which took office in 2024.

As Vice-President in the Jambon Government from 2019 to 2024, he also served as the Flemish Minister for Animal Welfare, the Brussels Periphery, Education, and Sport. He previously served in the Homans and Bourgeois governments from 2014 to 2019. He was a member of the Chamber of Representatives from 2008 to 2014.
