= Vlaamse Volksbeweging =

Flemish nationalist association

VVB Logo

VVB 50th Birthday Stamp

The Vlaamse Volksbeweging (Dutch pronunciation: [ˈvlaːmsə ˈvɔl(ə)ksbəˌʋeːɣɪŋ], "Flemish People's Movement") or VVB is a semi-independent Flemish nationalist non-profit association active in Belgium. Since 1991, the VVB has been campaigning for Flemish independence and belongs to the Flemish Movement. The VVB maintains good contacts with most Flemish political parties. Its members come from all over the political spectrum. There are close structural ties with the Language Action Committee (TAK) and the Flemish Committee for Brussels.

The VVB is one of the bigger social-cultural associations in Flanders. The VVB has a large number of local departments, a monthly magazine Onaf and specific workgroups. The VVB is officially recognised and thus subsidised by the Flemish Community as a socio-cultural association.

== History ==
The VVB was founded in 1956 as an independent and pluralistic pressure group chaired by Maurits Coppieters, a Flemish nationalist politician. At a VVB congress in 1962, then-political secretary Wilfried Martens launched the idea of federalism for then-unitary Belgium.

== Mission ==
The VVB strives towards the social, cultural and political emancipation of Flanders to an independent state in Europe and plays a proactive leading role in this by looking after Flemish interests. As non-partisan, pluralistic association, it therefore wants to involve the broad public opinion in that effort through socio-cultural means and encourage active commitment to the democratic decision-making process.

== Management ==
The current management rests with the board of directors, chairman Hugo Maes and director Hilde Roosens.

== Activities ==
The VVB is co-founder of EPI (European Partnership for Independence) and ICEC (International Commission of European Citizens). On 30 March 2014, the VVB organised a successful international demonstration for self-determination and independence in Brussels. At the annual Tour of Flanders, it distributes some 70,000 lion flags among the viewers.
