= Cieltje Van Achter =

Belgian lawyer and politician

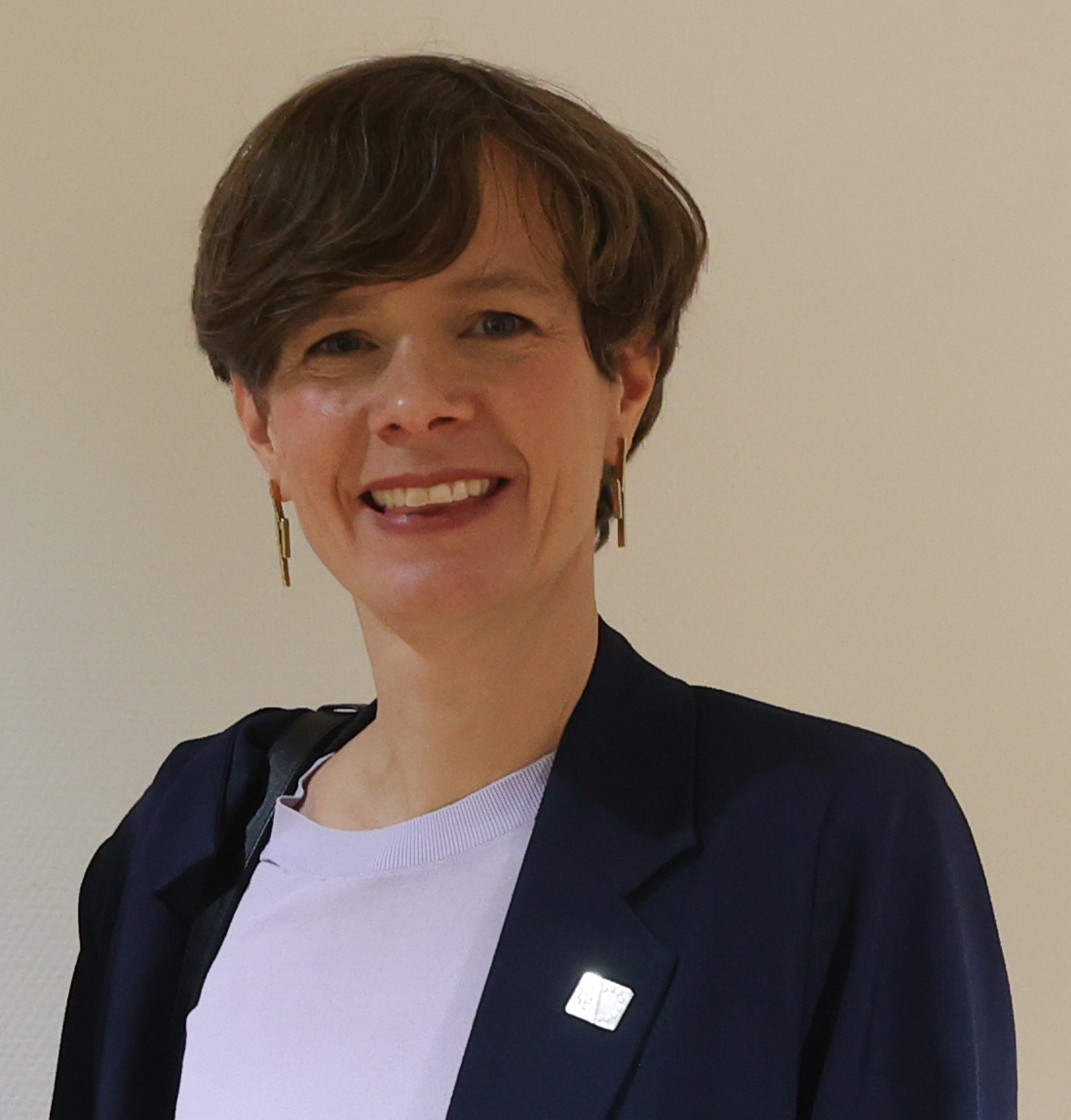
Cieltje Van Achter in November 2024 at the Education, Youth, Culture and Sport Council.

Cieltje Van Achter (born 1979) is a Belgian lawyer and politician and a member of the New Flemish Alliance party.

Van Achter is the daughter-in-law of former N-VA leader Geert Bourgeois. She studied law at the KU Leuven and the Université René Descartes in Paris. She later studied International Relations at Johns Hopkins University in Washington, DC.

Since 2014, she has served as a member of the Parliament of the Brussels-Capital Region. In the 2019 elections, she was re-elected as leader of the N-VA list in the Brussels Parliament with 3,256 preference votes. The party retained its three seats and became the second largest Dutch-speaking party. Van Achter subsequently became chairman of the N-VA faction in the Brussels Parliament.
