= Yves Leterme =

Belgian politician (born 1960)

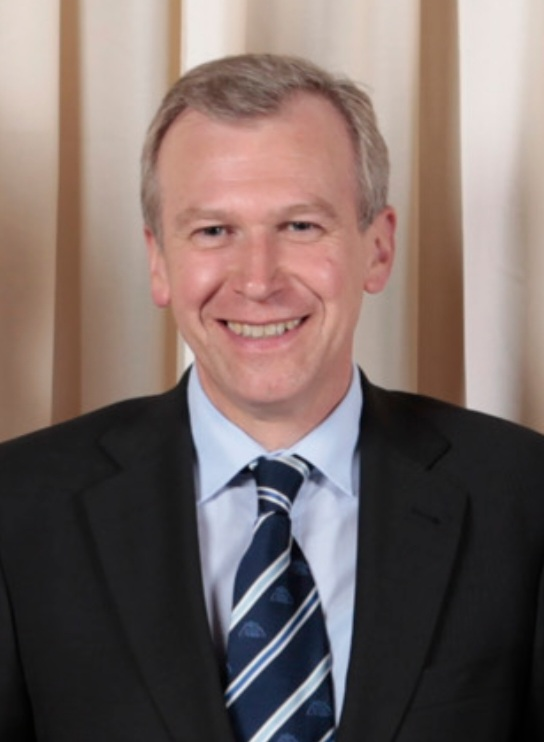
- Leterme in 2009

Prime Minister of Belgium
- In office 25 November 2009 – 6 December 2011
- Monarch: Albert II
- Deputy: Didier Reynders
- Preceded by: Herman Van Rompuy
- Succeeded by: Elio Di Rupo
- In office 20 March 2008 – 30 December 2008
- Monarch: Albert II
- Deputy: Didier Reynders
- Preceded by: Guy Verhofstadt
- Succeeded by: Herman Van Rompuy

Minister of Foreign Affairs
- In office 17 July 2009 – 25 November 2009
- Prime Minister: Herman Van Rompuy
- Preceded by: Karel De Gucht
- Succeeded by: Steven Vanackere

Minister-President of Flanders
- In office 20 July 2004 – 28 June 2007
- Preceded by: Bart Somers
- Succeeded by: Kris Peeters

President of CD&V
- In office 2003–2004
- Preceded by: Stefaan De Clerck
- Succeeded by: Jo Vandeurzen

Personal details
- Born: Yves Camille Désiré Leterme; 6 October 1960 (age 66) Wervik, Belgium
- Party: CD&V
- Spouse: Sofie Haesen
- Children: 3
- Education: Catholic University of Leuven; Ghent University

Yves Camille Désiré Leterme (Dutch: [ˈiːf ləˈtɛrmə]; born 6 October 1960) is a Belgian politician, a leader of the Christian Democratic and Flemish party (CD&V). He was the prime minister of Belgium from March 2008 to December 2008, and later from November 2009 to December 2011.

Leterme has also served as minister of Foreign Affairs, deputy prime minister and minister of Budget, Institutional Reforms, Transport and the North Sea in the Belgian federal government. He is a former minister-president of Flanders and Flemish minister of Agriculture and Fisheries. Despite his French name, Leterme is Flemish. He is fluent in Dutch, French and English.

On 14 July 2008, facing the imminent failure to meet a self-imposed deadline to enact "constitutional reform" consisting of further devolution of powers to the nation's three linguistic communities, Leterme tendered his resignation to King Albert II. On 17 July, King Albert, after holding a flurry of consultations with leaders of political parties, labour unions, and the employers' association, rejected Leterme's resignation. Instead, the King appointed a three-person commission of representatives of the linguistic communities to investigate how to restart the reform process. The commission was to report to the King by 31 July 2008.

On 19 December 2008 he offered his resignation to King Albert II after a crisis surrounding the sale of Fortis to BNP Paribas. On 22 December 2008 the King accepted his resignation, along with that of his entire government. He remained prime minister until 30 December, when Herman Van Rompuy was appointed as his successor. On 24 November 2009, it was announced that Leterme would once again become prime minister, succeeding Van Rompuy, who had been selected to become the first President of the European Council.

On 22 April 2010 he once again offered his resignation to King Albert II after a key Flemish party, the Open Flemish Liberals and Democrats, withdrew its support for the coalition government. An election followed in June, resulting in protracted attempts to negotiate a governing coalition. Leterme remained as caretaker prime minister, but on 13 September 2011 announced that he would leave the post by the end of the year to take up the position of Deputy Secretary-General at the Organisation for Economic Co-operation and Development. On 6 December 2011 Leterme was finally succeeded as prime minister by Elio Di Rupo, ending the longest run of a caretaker government in the developed world. The following day he was appointed to the honorary title of Minister of State.

== Early life ==
Yves Leterme was born on 6 October 1960 in the city of Wervik in the province of West Flanders. He is half-Walloon, and grew up fluently bilingual. He studied law at the Catholic University of Leuven where he received a LL.B. degree in 1981 and then studied at Ghent University where he obtained a BSc degree in Political Science (1983), a LL.M. degree (1984), and a MPA degree in 1985.

== Career ==
Before entering national politics, Leterme served as an auditor at the country's Court of Audit (Dutch: Rekenhof, French: Cour des Comptes). He then became adjunct and then national secretary of the Christian People's Party until he resigned to become a civil servant with the European Union. In 1997, he went on indefinite leave from that position when he was appointed Member of the Belgian Parliament. He has been a member of the city council of Ypres since 1995. He served as alderman of Ypres from 1995 to 2001.

He was appointed to the Chamber of Representatives in 1997, elected in 1999 and 2003. After the defeat of the CD&V in the general elections of 2003, he succeeded Stefaan De Clerck as party chairman. In 2004 Yves Leterme became Minister-President of the Flemish government. Flanders has fared well during his term in office. Yves Leterme took a pragmatic course of increasing the economic dynamic and social wellbeing in Flanders. He has made the Flemish government into the 'investment government', focusing the investments on the infrastructure and logistics with respect to both the business climate and social wellbeing (notably Flanders Port Area, homes for the elderly, child care, and immigrant integration). To accelerate investment he has successfully encouraged the use of the PPP structures. Additionally, Yves Leterme's government implemented rigorous budgeting – his government started with a sizeable implicit debt in Flanders which has been reduced to zero as the result of his policies.

In the elections held on 10 June 2007, Leterme received 796,521 personal votes, leading his party to a landslide victory. This was the second highest number of personal votes ever in Belgium's national elections. On 21 December 2007, he became Vice-Prime Minister of Belgium and Minister of Budget, Transport, Institutional Reform and the North Sea. On 23 March, Leterme received confidence of the chamber as prime minister.

== Controversies ==
Many French-speaking journalists have taken offence at Leterme's political opinions on the widely supported demand in Flanders for more regional autonomy. They consistently decry him for making what they say are provocative or erroneous statements.

During an interview with the French newspaper Libération in August 2006, Leterme, who is bilingual with a French-speaking father (and having a French name), made a remark about the overall failure and refusal of French-speaking inhabitants to learn and use Dutch in certain municipalities, more specifically in municipalities with language facilities.

Initially, the idea was that many French speakers would adjust to the new linguistic reality. But apparently the French speakers are intellectually not capable of learning Dutch.

Most prominent Francophone politicians such as Elio Di Rupo and Isabelle Durant along with some Flemish politicians such as Pascal Smet and Guy Vanhengel objected to this remark. In the Flemish daily De Standaard of 28 August Leterme explained his words: "I am allowed to ask myself the question whether the lack of knowledge of Dutch is a matter of not wanting or not being able to."

A news report produced by the Belgian Francophone television company RTBF alleged that Leterme said in the Flemish parliament: "I don't need the King". According to Flemish newspapers, this sentence was taken out of context, because Leterme was talking about the creation of Flemish statutes (decrees): legislation approved by the Flemish parliament, unlike federal legislation, does not need the king's signature to become law. The Flemish Minister-President signs the decrees himself.

On one occasion, Leterme quipped that the only things common to all Belgians are "the King, the football team, some beers...". Upon being asked by a television journalist to name which event is commemorated by Belgium's national day (21 July), Leterme wrongly replied that it was the proclamation of the constitution, when the correct answer is the coronation of the country's first King, Leopold I of Belgium. Subsequently, he was asked if he knew the French version of the Belgian national anthem, whereupon he began to sing the Marseillaise, the French national anthem, instead of the Brabançonne.

Leterme caused controversy again in a December 2007 interview with the Concentra newspapers by denouncing the RTBF for having its own political agenda, being a propagandist for CDH politician Joëlle Milquet and being a relic of the past. Leterme further compared the broadcaster to Radio Mille Collines, which was a Rwandan propaganda outlet against the Tutsis during the Rwandan genocide, though he later mentioned he had only quoted what was said in political circles.

== 2007 general elections ==
On 6 May 2007, he officially launched his candidacy for the general election on 10 June 2007, leading his party's list of candidates. On election day, he received about 800,000 preferential votes, the second largest number of votes ever gained in the history of Belgian elections. This was one of the greatest monster tallies in recent Belgian history (the previous comparable score was obtained by Leo Tindemans).

Based on this personal tally, on the successful tally of his party, and on the general election tallies which saw progress for most parties making the strongest demands for greater Flemish autonomy, such as CD&V, New-Flemish Alliance and the new Lijst Dedecker (LDD), status quo for the left-wing Greens, and regression for the far right Vlaams Belang and parties making only modest demands for greater Flemish autonomy, such as OpenVLD and Socialist Party - Different. Leterme as formateur convened the negotiations to form a coalition government, negotiations which would turn out to be protracted and initially lead to a stalemate.

== 2007–2008 political stalemate ==
Yves Leterme was the favourite to become the next Prime Minister of Belgium following the 2007 General Election. From 16 July to 23 August 2007, Leterme led the formal coalition talks into forming a new government. But the negotiations failed over constitutional reform and on 23 August he resigned as formateur.

On 29 September, Herman Van Rompuy, "explorer" in the coalition seeking process, presented his final report to the King. Later that day, King Albert II again appointed Leterme as formateur. On 7 November, his party took the initiative and got the Flemish representatives to vote on the most crucial aspect of the negotiations, the splitting of the electoral region of Brussels-Halle-Vilvoorde, a measure strongly opposed by the Francophone community.

Leterme again offered his resignation to the King on 1 December, after coalition talks failed to reach an agreement on several issues.

An interim government under Guy Verhofstadt was sworn in on 21 December 2007. In it, Leterme became deputy prime minister and Minister of the Budget, Institutional Reform, and Transport. He was anticipated to become prime minister in a new government in March 2008.

Belgium's political uncertainty further deepened when Yves Leterme was hospitalised on 14 February 2008. Rumours that he was suffering from hepatitis were formally denied by a spokesman, and it was later disclosed that he had suffered internal bleeding in the gastrointestinal tract. His duties as Minister for Budget and Institutional Reform were temporarily taken over by Jo Vandeurzen (CD&V), the Minister for Justice.

== Prime Minister of Belgium, first premiership ==
On 18 March 2008, an agreement between five parties on the formation of the new government was announced. Leterme was sworn in as prime minister on 20 March, and his government was approved by the Chamber of Representatives on 22 March, with 97 votes in favour, 48 against, and one abstaining.

For Leterme, priority issues were still further devolution of power to Belgium's regions, which would require amending the national constitution, and resolving dissatisfaction with the administrative status of the districts of Brussels-Halle-Vilvoorde. He set a deadline of 15 July 2008 to accomplish these goals. The deadline was not met. On 15 July 2008, King Albert II issued a communiqué that Leterme had offered his resignation to the king, and that the king was reserving his decision on whether to accept the resignation. The next day, the king held consultations with the leaders of political parties, the employers' association, and trades unions. By the end of the day, it was still not resolved whether Leterme would actually be departing from the prime ministership. Leterme declared, "It appears that the [language] communities' conflicting visions of how to give a new equilibrium to our state have become incompatible . . . state reform remains essential".

=== Fortis and fall of government ===
Along with his counterparts in the Netherlands and Luxembourg, Leterme decided to nationalise ailing financial-services company Fortis. The company was split and the Belgian government sold the Belgian part to French bank BNP Paribas. The shareholders, who were not consulted in the sale, sued the Belgian state. Although at first the government won, on appeal the court of appeal reversed the judgement of the lower court and ordered the freezing of the sale. Following the verdict, First President Ghislain Londers of the Court of Cassation indicated that government officials had tried to influence the judges. Leterme tendered his resignation and that of his government on 19 December 2008, which was accepted by King Albert II on 22 December.

== Minister of Foreign Affairs and Second Premiership ==
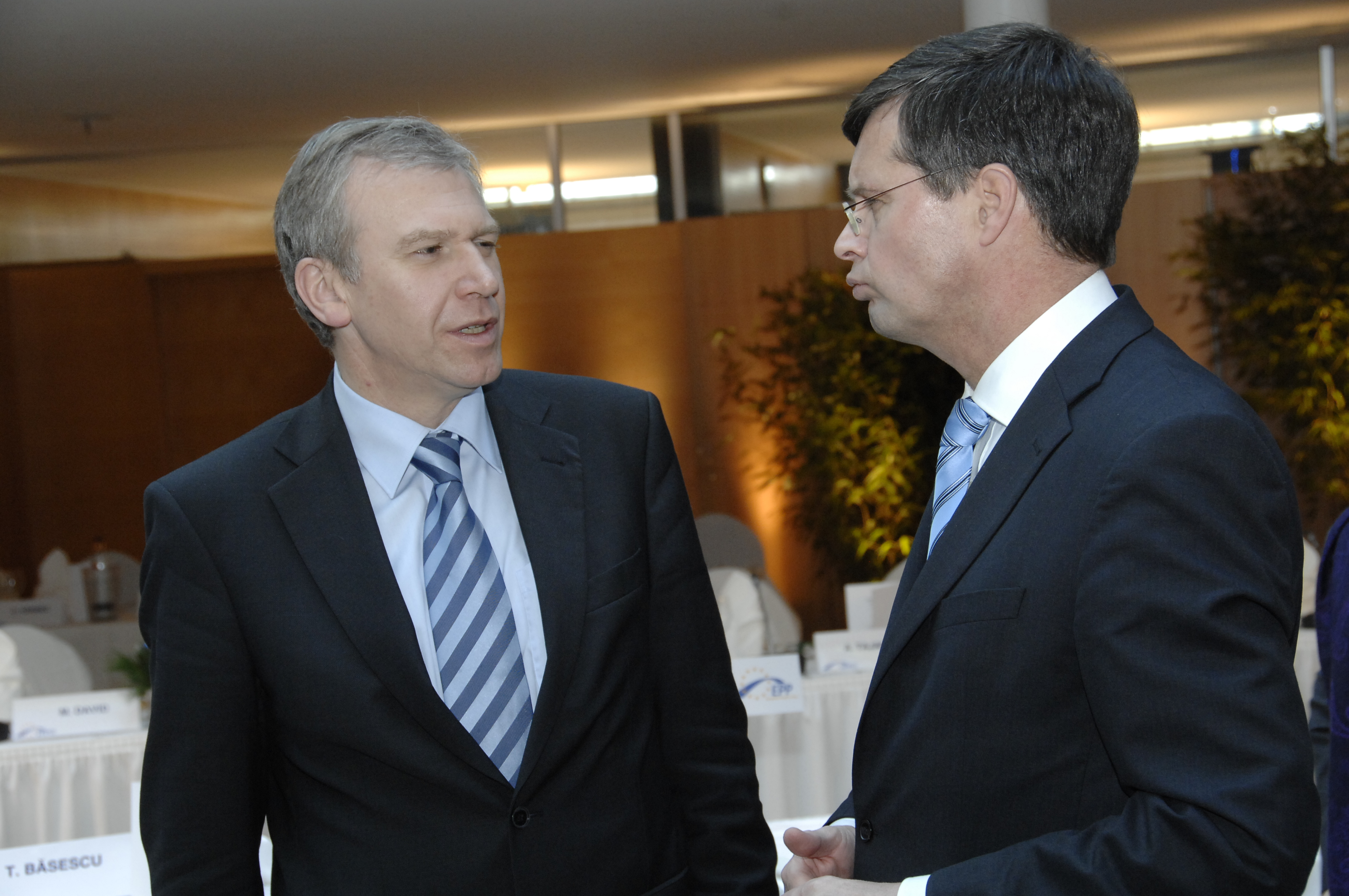
Leterme meets with Prime Minister of the Netherlands Jan Peter Balkenende in the EPP Congress in Bonn, 10 December 2009

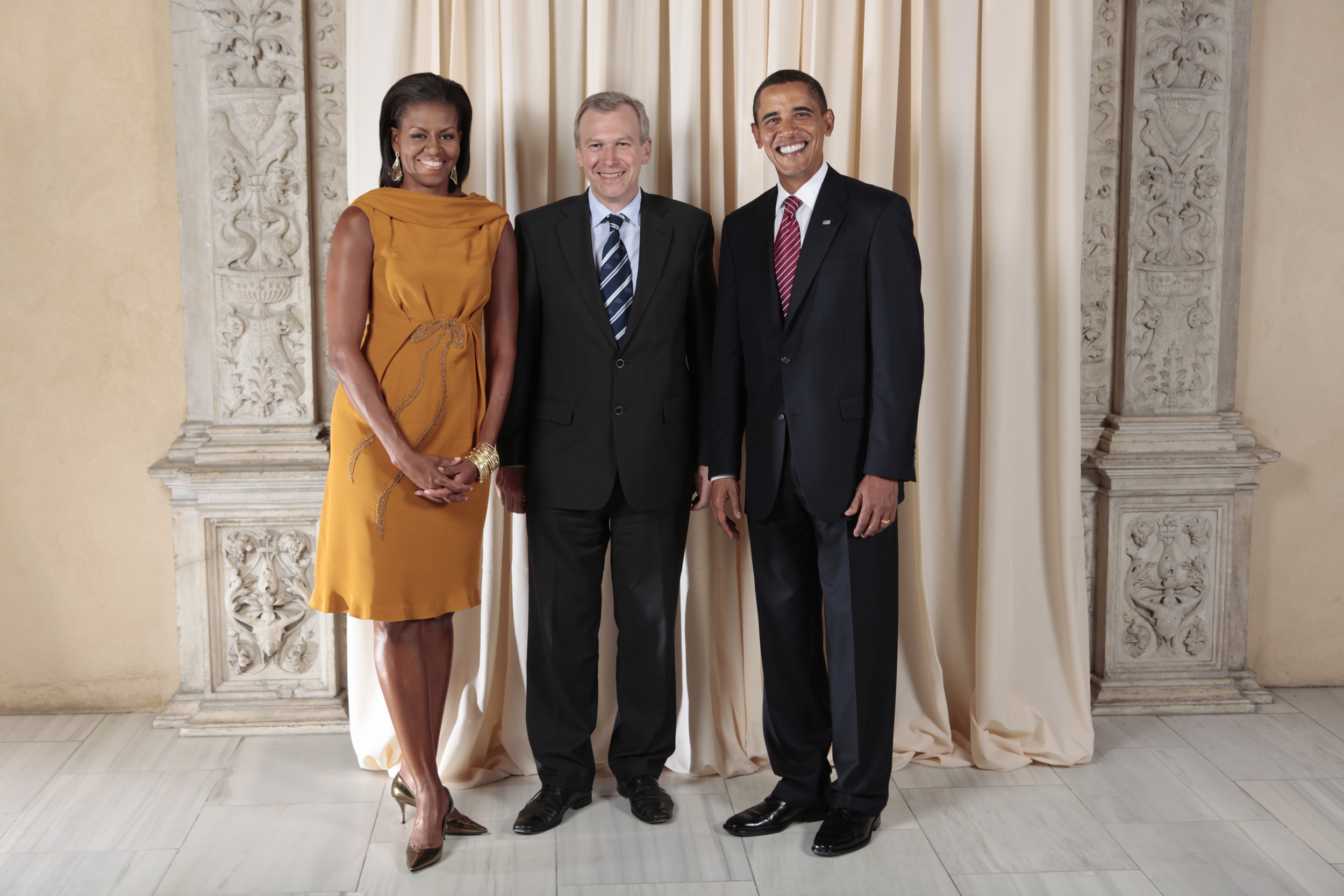
US President Barack Obama and First Lady Michelle Obama pose for a photo during a reception at the Metropolitan Museum in New York with Leterme, 23 September 2009

With 17 July 2009 government reshuffle, Leterme succeeded Karel De Gucht, who became European Commissioner, as the minister of foreign affairs in the Van Rompuy I Government. Following Van Rompuy's assignation as president of the European Council, Leterme once again became Prime Minister of Belgium. His place as Minister of Foreign Affairs was taken by Steven Vanackere.

With 17 July 2009 government reshuffle, Leterme succeeded Karel De Gucht, who became European Commissioner, as the minister of foreign affairs in the Van Rompuy I Government. Following Van Rompuy's assignation as president of the European Council, Leterme once again became Prime Minister of Belgium. His place as Minister of Foreign Affairs was taken by Steven Vanackere.

In complicated negotiations regarding the bilingual electoral unit Brussels-Halle-Vilvoorde surrounding Belgian capital Brussels a deadline set by government party Open VLD was not met. Following the departure on 22 April 2010 of this party from the government Leterme had to offer the resignation of his government once again. On 26 April the resignation was accepted by the King after the appointed mediator Didier Reynders failed in his task and a general election was held in June 2010. Due to the longitivity of the negotiations for the government formation, Leterme headed a caretaker government for 589 days—the longest-such run for a developed country—until Elio di Rupo was finally appointed prime minister in December 2011.

== Post-premiership ==
After Elio Di Rupo succeeded him as prime minister, Leterme took up the position of Deputy Secretary-General at the Organisation for Economic Co-operation and Development (OECD), starting 1 January 2012.

Leterme still supported his party in the October 2012 municipal elections. He was the main candidate for the CD&V/N-VA list in Ypres, which maintained its absolute majority. During the election he said "Honesty commands me to tell you I cannot become mayor right away because I must honour my earlier commitment to the OECD." And so after winning the election, Leterme remained active at international level, and third runner up in the party, Jan Durnez became mayor of Ypres instead.

In 2014, Leterme became secretary-general of the International Institute for Democracy and Electoral Assistance (International IDEA). On 7 March 2016 he announced his definitive departure from political life as he did not see himself able to combine it anymore with his international career. He has since taken on a number of paid and unpaid positions:

- Volkswagen, Member of the Sustainability Council (since 2016)
- Kofi Annan Foundation, Vice-Chair of the Commission on Elections and Democracy in the Digital Age (since 2018)

In 2019, Leterme became co-chairman of the board of directors of the Chinese investment fund ToJoy, alongside the former Serbian president Boris Tadić and José María Figueres, former president of Costa Rica. The appointment was criticized by international relations professor Jonathan Holslag, citing the close relations between ToJoy and the Chinese political establishment.

On 3 September 2025, he was in Beijing for a military parade to celebrate the 80th birthday of the end of the Second World War, together with Chinese president Xi Jingping and about twenty other foreign leaders, including Russian president Vladimir Putin and North Korean leader Kim Jong-Un.

== Foreign relations ==
=== Lebanon ===
On 29 November 2008, President of Lebanon Michel Sleiman discussed with Leterme the Lebanese domestic situation and its foreign relations, particularly its relations with Syria.

=== Vietnam ===
On 11 August 2009, Leterme started a two-day visit to Vietnam to boost bilateral and multifaceted co-operation between the two countries. It was his first official visit to Vietnam since Leterme took up his post as foreign minister the previous month. Leterme met with Vietnamese officials to strengthen bilateral relations and co-operation in several sectors including politics, economics, and trade and investment, as well as discussed regional and global issues that are of interest to both sides. Vietnam is currently the only Asian country receiving preferential development aid from the Belgian government for the 2007–2010 period, in the amount of 32 million euro (US$45 million). In 2008, two-way trade reached nearly $1.4 billion and Belgium is now Vietnam's fourth largest export market among EU countries.

== Private life and hobbies ==
Leterme is known to be very fond of goats. He breeds goats in his private time in the small farm where he lives. In November 2010 the Belgian newspaper Het Nieuwsblad had some more news about Yves' favourite animals: two of his favourite goats, named Trudy and Vicky, were to appear in a play by the local theatre society of Ypres. The play is called 'Island of the goats'. In an interview Yves called goats "The poor man's cow."

Political offices
Preceded by Bart Somers	Minister-President of Flanders; 2004–2007	Succeeded by Kris Peeters
Preceded by Guy Verhofstadt	Prime Minister of Belgium; 2008	Succeeded by Herman Van Rompuy
Preceded by Karel De Gucht	Minister of Foreign Affairs; 2009	Succeeded by Steven Vanackere
Preceded by Herman Van Rompuy	Prime Minister of Belgium; 2009–2011	Succeeded by Elio Di Rupo
Academic offices
Preceded by David Miliband	Speaker of the College of Europe Opening Ceremony; 2008	Succeeded by Jerzy Buzek
