= Minister of Justice (Belgium) =

The minister of justice of Belgium is responsible for the Federal Public Service Justice.

== List of ministers ==
=== 1831–1899 ===
- 1831 Alexandre Gendebien (liberal)
- 1831 Antoine Barthélémy (liberal)
- 1831–1832 Jean Raikem (Catholic)
- 1832–1834 Joseph Lebeau (liberal)
- 1834–1839 Antoine Ernst (liberal)
- 1839 Jean-Baptiste Nothomb (liberal)
- 1839–1840 Jean Raikem (Catholic)
- 1840–1841 Mathieu Leclercq (liberal)
- 1841–1842 Guillaume Van Volxem (liberal)
- 1842–1843 Jean-Baptiste Nothomb (liberal)
- 1843–1847 Jules Joseph d'Anethan (Catholic)
- 1847–1850 François-Philippe de Haussy (liberal)
- 1850–1852 Victor Tesch (liberal)
- 1852–1855 Charles Faider (liberal)
- 1855–1857 Alphonse Nothomb (Katholiek
- 1857–1865 Victor Tesch (liberal)
- 1865–1870 Jules Bara (liberal)
- 1870–1871 Prosper Cornesse (Katholieke Partij)
- 1871–1878 Théophile de Lantsheere (Katholieke Partij)
- 1878–1884 Jules Bara (liberal)
- 1884 Charles Woeste (Katholieke Partij)
- 1884–1887 Joseph Devolder (Katholieke Partij)
- 1887–1894 Jules Le Jeune (Katholieke Partij)
- 1894–1899 Victor Begerem (Katholieke Partij)

=== 1900–1999 ===
- 1899–1907 Jules Van den Heuvel (Katholieke Partij)
- 1907–1908 Jules Renkin (Katholieke Partij)
- 1908–1911 Léon de Lantsheere (Katholieke Partij)
- 1911–1918 Henri Carton de Wiart (Katholieke Partij)
- 1918–1921 Emile Vandervelde (BWP)
- 1921 Aloys Van de Vyvere (Katholieke Partij)
- 1921–1925 Fulgence Masson (liberal)
- 1925 Léon Théodor (Katholieke Partij)
- 1925 Paul Tschoffen (Katholieke Partij)
- 1925–1926 Prosper Poullet (Katholieke Partij)
- 1926–1927 Paul Hymans (liberal)
- 1927–1931 Paul-Emile Janson (liberal)
- 1931–1932 Fernand Cocq (liberal)
- 1932–1934 Paul-Emile Janson (liberal)
- 1934–1935 François Bovesse (liberal)
- 1935–1936 Eugène Soudan (POB)
- 1936–1937 François Bovesse (liberal)
- 1937 Hubert Pierlot (Katholieke Partij)
- 1937 Victor de Laveleye (liberal)
- 1937 Victor Maistriau (liberal)
- 1937–1938 Charles du Bus de Warnaffe (Katholieke Partij)
- 1938–1939 Joseph Pholien (Katholieke Partij)
- 1939 Émile, Baron van Dievoet (Katholieke Partij)
- 1939 August de Schryver (Katholieke Partij)
- 1939 Eugène Soudan POB)
- 1939 Paul-Emile Janson (liberal)
- 1939–1940 Eugène Soudan POB)
- 1940 Paul-Emile Janson (liberal)
- 1940–1942 Albert de Vleeschauwer (Katholieke Partij)
- 1942–1944 Antoine Delfosse (Katholieke Partij)
- 1944–1945 Maurice Verbaet (Katholieke Partij)
- 1945 Charles du Bus de Warnaffe (Katholieke Partij)
- 1945–1946 Marcel Grégoire (UDB)
- 1946 Henri Rolin (PSB)
- 1946 Adolphe Van Glabbeke (liberal)
- 1946–1947 Albert Lilar (liberal)
- 1947–1948 Paul Struye (PSC)
- 1948–1949 Henri Moreau de Melen (PSC)
- 1949–1950 Albert Lilar (liberal)
- 1950 Henri Carton de Wiart (PSC)
- 1950–1952 Ludovic Moyersoen (CVP)
- 1952 Joseph Pholien (PSC)
- 1952 Léonce Lagae (CVP)
- 1952–1954 Charles du Bus de Warnaffe (PSC)
- 1954–1958 Albert Lilar (liberal)
- 1958 Pierre Harmel (PSC)
- 1958–1960 Laurent Merchiers (liberal)
- 1960–1961 Albert Lilar (liberal)
- 1961–1965 Piet Vermeylen (BSP)
- 1965–1968 Pierre Wigny (PSC)
- 1968–1973 Alfons Vranckx (BSP)
- 1973–1977 Herman Vanderpoorten (PVV)
- 1977–1980 Renaat Van Elslande (CVP)
- 1980 Herman Vanderpoorten (PVV)
- 1980–1981 Philippe Moureaux (PSB)
- 1981–1988 Jean Gol (PRL)
  - 1985–1988 Georges Mundeleer (PRL) (state secretary)
- 1988–1995 Melchior Wathelet (PSC)
- 1995–1998 Stefaan De Clerck (CVP)
- 1998–1999 Tony Van Parys (CVP)

=== 2000– ===
Portrait	Name (Born–Died)	Term of office			Political party	Government	Prime Minister
Portrait	Name (Born–Died)	Took office	Left office	Time in office	Political party	Government	Prime Minister
	Marc Verwilghen (born 1952)	12 July 1999	11 July 2003	4 years, 0 days	Open Flemish Liberals and Democrats	Verhofstadt I	Guy Verhofstadt (Open VLD)
	Laurette Onkelinx (born 1958)	11 July 2003	21 December 2007	4 years, 164 days	Socialist Party	Verhofstadt II	Guy Verhofstadt (Open VLD)
	Laurette Onkelinx (born 1958)	11 July 2003	21 December 2007	4 years, 164 days	Socialist Party	Verhofstadt III	Guy Verhofstadt (Open VLD)
	Jo Vandeurzen (born 1958)	21 December 2007	22 December 2008	1 year, 2 days	Christian Democratic and Flemish	Leterme I	Yves Leterme (CD&V)
	Stefaan De Clerck (born 1951)	30 December 2008	6 December 2011	2 years, 350 days	Christian Democratic and Flemish	Van Rompuy	Herman Van Rompuy (CD&V)
	Stefaan De Clerck (born 1951)	30 December 2008	6 December 2011	2 years, 350 days	Christian Democratic and Flemish	Leterme II	Yves Leterme (CD&V)
	Annemie Turtelboom (born 1967)	6 December 2011	25 July 2014	2 years, 232 days	Open Flemish Liberals and Democrats	Di Rupo	Elio Di Rupo (PS)
	Maggie De Block (born 1962)	25 July 2014	11 October 2014	79 days	Open Flemish Liberals and Democrats	Di Rupo	Elio Di Rupo (PS)
	Koen Geens (born 1958)	11 October 2014	1 October 2020	5 years, 357 days	Christian Democratic and Flemish	Michel I	Charles Michel (MR)
	Koen Geens (born 1958)	11 October 2014	1 October 2020	5 years, 357 days	Christian Democratic and Flemish	Michel II	Charles Michel (MR)
	Koen Geens (born 1958)	11 October 2014	1 October 2020	5 years, 357 days	Christian Democratic and Flemish	Wilmès I	Sophie Wilmès (MR)
	Koen Geens (born 1958)	11 October 2014	1 October 2020	5 years, 357 days	Christian Democratic and Flemish	Wilmès II	Sophie Wilmès (MR)
	Vincent Van Quickenborne (born 1973)	1 October 2020	20 October 2023	3 years, 20 days	Open Flemish Liberals and Democrats	Vivaldi	Alexander De Croo (Open VLD)
	Paul Van Tigchelt (born 1973)	22 October 2023	3 February 2025	1 year, 105 days	Open Flemish Liberals and Democrats	Vivaldi	Alexander De Croo (Open VLD)
	Annelies Verlinden (born 1978)	3 February 2025	present	1 year, 76 days	Christian Democratic and Flemish	De Wever	Bart De Wever (N-VA)
