= Kortrijk (Chamber of Representatives constituency) =

Belgian political subdivision

Kortrijk was a constituency used to elect members of the Belgian Chamber of Representatives between 1831 and 1995.

== Representatives ==
Election	Representative (Party)	Representative (Party)	Representative (Party)	Representative (Party)	Representative (Party)	Representative (Party)
1831	Adolphe Levae (Catholic)	Ange Angillis (Liberal)	Felix de Mûelenaere (Catholic)	3 seats		
1833	Ignace Bekaert-Baeckelandt (Catholic)	François Verrue-Lafrancq (Liberal)	Felix de Mûelenaere (Catholic)	3 seats		
1837	Ange Angillis (Liberal)	Jean-Baptiste Van Cutsem (Liberal)	Felix de Mûelenaere (Catholic)	3 seats		
1841	Désiré de Haerne (Catholic)	Jean-Baptiste Van Cutsem (Liberal)	Felix de Mûelenaere (Catholic)	3 seats		
1845	Désiré de Haerne (Catholic)	Jean-Baptiste Van Cutsem (Liberal)	Felix de Mûelenaere (Catholic)	3 seats		
1848	Désiré de Haerne (Catholic)	Ernest Vandenpeereboom (Liberal)	Bernard Boulez (Catholic)	3 seats		
1852	Désiré de Haerne (Catholic)	Pierre Tack (Catholic)	Bernard Boulez (Catholic)	3 seats		
1856	Désiré de Haerne (Catholic)	Pierre Tack (Catholic)	Bernard Boulez (Catholic)	3 seats		
1857	Désiré de Haerne (Catholic)	Pierre Tack (Catholic)	Henri Dumortier (Catholic)	3 seats		
1861	Désiré de Haerne (Catholic)	Pierre Tack (Catholic)	Henri Dumortier (Catholic)	3 seats		
1864	Désiré de Haerne (Catholic)	Pierre Tack (Catholic)	Auguste Reynaert (Catholic)	3 seats		
1868	Désiré de Haerne (Catholic)	Pierre Tack (Catholic)	Auguste Reynaert (Catholic)	3 seats		
1870	Désiré de Haerne (Catholic)	Pierre Tack (Catholic)	Auguste Reynaert (Catholic)	3 seats		
1874	Désiré de Haerne (Catholic)	Pierre Tack (Catholic)	Auguste Reynaert (Catholic)	3 seats		
1878	Désiré de Haerne (Catholic)	Pierre Tack (Catholic)	Auguste Reynaert (Catholic)	Jules Vandenpeereboom (Catholic)	4 seats	
1882	Désiré de Haerne (Catholic)	Pierre Tack (Catholic)	Auguste Reynaert (Catholic)	Jules Vandenpeereboom (Catholic)	4 seats	
1886	Julien Liebaert (Catholic)	Pierre Tack (Catholic)	Auguste Reynaert (Catholic)	Jules Vandenpeereboom (Catholic)	4 seats	
1890	Julien Liebaert (Catholic)	Pierre Tack (Catholic)	Auguste Reynaert (Catholic)	Jules Vandenpeereboom (Catholic)	4 seats	
1892	Julien Liebaert (Catholic)	Pierre Tack (Catholic)	Auguste Reynaert (Catholic)	Jules Vandenpeereboom (Catholic)	4 seats	
1894	Julien Liebaert (Catholic)	Pierre Tack (Catholic)	Auguste Reynaert (Catholic)	Jules Vandenpeereboom (Catholic)	4 seats	
1898	Julien Liebaert (Catholic)	Pierre Tack (Catholic)	Auguste Reynaert (Catholic)	Jules Vandenpeereboom (Catholic)	4 seats	
1900	Julien Liebaert (Catholic)	Pierre Tack (Catholic)	Auguste Reynaert (Catholic)	Edouard Busschaert (Catholic)	Raymond Vande Venne (Liberal)	5 seats
1904	Julien Liebaert (Catholic)	August Debunne (PS)	Auguste Reynaert (Catholic)	Edouard Busschaert (Catholic)	Raymond Vande Venne (Liberal)	5 seats
1908	Julien Liebaert (Catholic)	August Debunne (PS)	Augustin Peel (Catholic)	Ernest Reynaert (Catholic)	Herman Van Leynseele (Liberal)	5 seats
1912	Julien Liebaert (Catholic)	August Debunne (PS)	Augustin Peel (Catholic)	Ernest Reynaert (Catholic)	Frans Goethals (Catholic)	5 seats
1919	Arthur Catteeuw (Catholic)	August Debunne (PS)	Augustin Peel (Catholic)	Ernest Reynaert (Catholic)	Joseph Vandevelde (PS)	5 seats
1921	Arthur Catteeuw (Catholic)	August Debunne (PS)	Henri Duchatel (Catholic)	Ernest Reynaert (Catholic)	Joseph Vandevelde (PS)	5 seats
1925	Arthur Catteeuw (Catholic)	August Debunne (PS)	Henri Duchatel (Catholic)	Ernest Reynaert (Catholic)	Joseph Vandevelde (PS)	5 seats
1929	Arthur Catteeuw (Catholic)	August Debunne (PS)	Jules Deconinck (PS)	Ernest Reynaert (Catholic)	Joseph Vandevelde (PS)	5 seats
1932	Arthur Mayeur (Catholic)	August Debunne (PS)	Jules Coussens (Catholic)	Ernest Reynaert (Catholic)	Joseph Vandevelde (PS)	5 seats
1936	Maurice De Jaegere (Catholic)	August Debunne (PS)	Jules Coussens (Catholic)	Omer Vandenberghe (Catholic)	Joseph Vandevelde (PS)	Jules Deconinck (PS)
1939	Maurice De Jaegere (Catholic)	August Debunne (PS)	Jules Coussens (Catholic)	Omer Vandenberghe (Catholic)	Joseph Vandevelde (PS)	Valeer Tahon (Liberal)
1946	Albert De Clerck (CVP)	August Debunne (PS)	Alfred De Taeye (CVP)	Omer Vandenberghe (Catholic)	Joseph Vandevelde (PS)	André Dequae (CVP)
1949	Albert De Clerck (CVP)	Jules Deconinck (BSP)	Alfred De Taeye (CVP)	Omer Vandenberghe (Catholic)	Marcel Demets (BSP)	André Dequae (CVP)
1950	Albert De Clerck (CVP)	Jules Deconinck (BSP)	Alfred De Taeye (CVP)	Omer Vandenberghe (Catholic)	Marcel Demets (BSP)	André Dequae (CVP)
1954	Albert De Clerck (CVP)	Jules Deconinck (BSP)	Marcel Coucke (CVP)	Valeer Tahon (Liberal)	Marcel Demets (BSP)	André Dequae (CVP)
1958	Albert Lavens (CVP)	Jules Deconinck (BSP)	Leopold Verhenne (CVP)	Robert Devos (CVP)	Marcel Demets (BSP)	André Dequae (CVP)
1961	Albert Lavens (CVP)	Jules Deconinck (BSP)	Leopold Verhenne (CVP)	Robert Devos (CVP)	Marcel Demets (BSP)	André Dequae (CVP)
1965	Albert Lavens (CVP)	Jules Mathys (BSP)	Leopold Verhenne (CVP)	André Kempinaire (PVV)	Marcel Vandenhove (BSP)	André Dequae (CVP)
1968	Luc Vansteenkiste (VU)	Jules Mathys (BSP)	Leopold Verhenne (CVP)	Marcel Coucke (CVP)	Marcel Vandenhove (BSP)	André Dequae (CVP)
1971	Luc Vansteenkiste (VU)	Jules Mathys (BSP)	Leopold Verhenne (CVP)	André Kempinaire (PVV)	Marcel Vandenhove (BSP)	André Dequae (CVP)
1974	Luc Vansteenkiste (VU)	Jules Mathys (BSP)	Marc Olivier (CVP)	André Kempinaire (PVV)	Marcel Coucke (CVP)	André Dequae (CVP)
1977	Luc Vansteenkiste (VU)	Marc Bourry (BSP)	Marc Olivier (CVP)	André Kempinaire (PVV)	Antoon Steverlynck (CVP)	Francine Demeulenaere-Dewilde (CVP)
1978	Marcel Vandenhove (BSP)	Marc Bourry (BSP)	Marc Olivier (CVP)	André Kempinaire (PVV)	Antoon Steverlynck (CVP)	Francine Demeulenaere-Dewilde (CVP)
1981	Erik Derycke (PS)	Gilbert Bossuyt (PS)	Marc Olivier (CVP)	André Kempinaire (PVV)	Antoon Steverlynck (CVP)	Franz Vansteenkiste (VU)
1985	Erik Derycke (PS)	Gilbert Bossuyt (PS)	Marc Olivier (CVP)	André Kempinaire (PVV)	Antoon Steverlynck (CVP)	Franz Vansteenkiste (VU)
1988	Erik Derycke (PS)	Gilbert Bossuyt (PS)	Marc Olivier (CVP)	André Kempinaire (PVV)	Stefaan De Clerck (CVP)	Paul Vangansbeke (VU)
1991	Erik Derycke (PS)	Gilbert Bossuyt (PS)	Marc Olivier (CVP)	André Kempinaire (PVV)	Stefaan De Clerck (CVP)	Peter Desmet (CVP)
1995	Merged into Kortrijk-Roeselare-Tielt					
