= Tournai-Ath-Mouscron (Chamber of Representatives constituency) =

Tournai-Ath-Mouscron: 1965-2003, Belgium

Tournai-Ath-Mouscron was a constituency used to elect members of the Belgian Chamber of Representatives and 2003.

== Representatives ==
Election	Representative (Party)	Representative (Party)	Representative (Party)	Representative (Party)	Representative (Party)	Representative (Party)	Representative (Party)
1965	André Delrue (PCB)	Henri Castel (BSP)	Jean Picron (PVV)	Marcel Demets (BSP)	Pierre Wigny (CVP)	René Lefebvre (PVV)	Robert Devos (CVP)
1968	Paul Vandamme (RW)	Henri Castel (BSP)	Jean Picron (PVV)	Marcel Demets (BSP)	Pierre Wigny (CVP)	René Lefebvre (PVV)	Robert Devos (CVP)
1971	Paul Vandamme (RW)	Henri Castel (BSP)	Jean Picron (PVV)	Marcel Demets (BSP)	André Delrue (PCB)	René Lefebvre (PVV)	Robert Devos (CVP)
1974	André Soudant (PLP)	Georgette Brenez (PSB)	Jean Picron (PVV)	Marcel Demets (BSP)	André Delrue (PCB)	Jean-Baptiste Delhaye (PSB)	Robert Devos (CVP)
1977	André Bertouille (PRL)	Georgette Brenez (PSB)	Jean Picron (PVV)	Jean-Pierre Perdieu (PSB)	Pierre Deschamps (cdH)	Jean-Baptiste Delhaye (PSB)	Robert Devos (CVP)
1978	André Bertouille (PRL)	Georgette Brenez (PSB)	Jean-Pierre Detremmerie (cdH)	Jean-Pierre Perdieu (PSB)	Pierre Deschamps (cdH)	Jean-Baptiste Delhaye (PSB)	Pierre Maistriaux (PRL)
1981	André Bertouille (PRL)	Georgette Brenez (PSB)	Jean-Pierre Detremmerie (cdH)	Jean-Pierre Perdieu (PSB)	Marc Lestienne (cdH)	Jean-Baptiste Delhaye (PSB)	Denis D'hondt (PRL)
1985	André Bertouille (PRL)	6 seats	Jean-Pierre Detremmerie (cdH)	Jean-Pierre Perdieu (PSB)	Marc Lestienne (cdH)	Jean-Baptiste Delhaye (PSB)	Denis D'hondt (PRL)
1988	André Bertouille (PRL)	6 seats	Jean-Pierre Detremmerie (cdH)	Jean-Pierre Perdieu (PSB)	François Dufour (PS)	Jacques Leroy (PS)	Denis D'hondt (PRL)
1991	André Bertouille (PRL)	6 seats	Jean-Pierre Detremmerie (cdH)	Jean-Pierre Perdieu (PSB)	François Dufour (PS)	Georges Sénéca (cdH)	René Dejonckheere (Ecolo)
1995	Denis D'hondt (PRL)	4 seats	Jean-Pierre Detremmerie (cdH)	Rudy Demotte (PS)	François Dufour (PS)	4 seats	
1999	Denis D'hondt (PRL)	4 seats	Jean-Pierre Detremmerie (cdH)	Bruno Van Grootenbrulle (PS)	François Dufour (PS)	4 seats	
