= Damien Yzerbyt =

Belgian politician

Member of the Parliament of Wallonia
- In office April 2005 – January 2014

Member of the Parliament of the French Community
- In office April 2005 – January 2014

Member of the Chamber of Representatives
- In office July 2004 – April 2005

Alderman of Mouscron
- In office 2001–2014

Personal details
- Born: December 10, 1963 Mouscron, Belgium
- Died: January 19, 2014 (aged 50) Mouscron, Belgium
- Party: cdH
- Spouse: Yes
- Children: 2 sons
- Occupation: Politician, teacher

Damien Yzerbyt (10 December 1963 - 19 January 2014) was a Belgian politician (cdH) and a member of the Parliament of Wallonia. He was also active in the Parliament of the French Community and briefly served in the Belgian Chamber of Representatives. A long-serving alderman and municipal councillor in Mouscron, Yzerbyt played a key role in local governance for nearly two decades, overseeing areas such as planning, housing, and public works. Originally trained as a philologist and theologian, he began his professional life as a teacher before moving into politics in the 1990s. Known for his dedication to public service, he remained politically active until his death in 2014.

== Biography ==
Damien Yzerbyt was born at Mouscron or at nearby Courtrai-Kortrijk. He graduated from the Catholic (francophone) University in Louvain in 1987 with a degree in Romance Philology and Theology, and then embarked on a teaching career at the St Henry Technical academy in Mouscron, where he taught French and Religion. With a reportedly poorly prepared reallocation of responsibilities for education he was caught up in a period of some turbulence, with a series of strikes in the education sector during 1990/91. Colleagues nominated him to a new consultative-conciliation body called the Conseil d’Entreprise (1992-2004).

He involved himself in Christian associations and then moved on to politics, successfully standing for office in Mouscron in the local elections in October 1994. He was elected as a municipal councillor in 1997 and as an alderman in 2001, serving under Mayor Detremmerie, with a broad portfolio of responsibilities that covered planning and development, land use, housing, youth, mobility issues, pensions and religions.

He retained his municipal responsibilities until his death in 2014. In addition, after Catherine Fonck moved on to become francophone Minister for Children, Youth and Health, on 19 July 2004 Yzerbyt took the seat that she had vacated in the national Chamber of Representatives. Less than a year later, in April 2005, he replaced Jean-Pierre Detremmerie as a deputy in the Parliament of Wallonia when the latter resigned in the context of a slow-burn controversy involving the local football club. Because of the country's constitutional structure, this also involved taking Detremmerie's place in the Brussels-based Parliament of the French Community. For Yzerbyt this also meant quitting his seat in the national Chamber of Representatives after less than a year. In the Parliament of Wallonia he was a member of the Commission for Domestic Affairs and Public Officials ("Commission des Affaires intérieures et de la Fonction publique").

At the time of the municipal elections of October 2006, when Detremmerie let it be known that after 25 years in office he would no longer stand for election as mayor of Mouscron, he recommended as his successor Alfred Gadenne, as part of a two-man team, with Yzerbyt to be the alderman responsible for finances and public works. The next election, in October 2012, the two men dominated the ballot, indicating that voters still endorsed Detremmerie's recommendations on the matter of his succession.

His final years were increasingly affected by the Pancreatic cancer from which he died, a few weeks after celebrating his fiftieth birthday, at the main hospital in Mouscron at around three in the morning on 19 January 2014.

In the Parliament of Wallonia the seat he had vacated was taken on by Ides Cauchie.

== Personal life ==
Damien Yzerbyt was married, with two recorded sons.

== Tribute ==
In June 2016 colleagues and family members formally inaugurated the esplanade in front of Mouscron's council offices in the Courtrai Road. The esplanade, called the "Esplanade Damien Yzerbyt", includes a commemorative plaque and memorial to him.
