= François Bovesse =

Belgian politician (1890–1944)

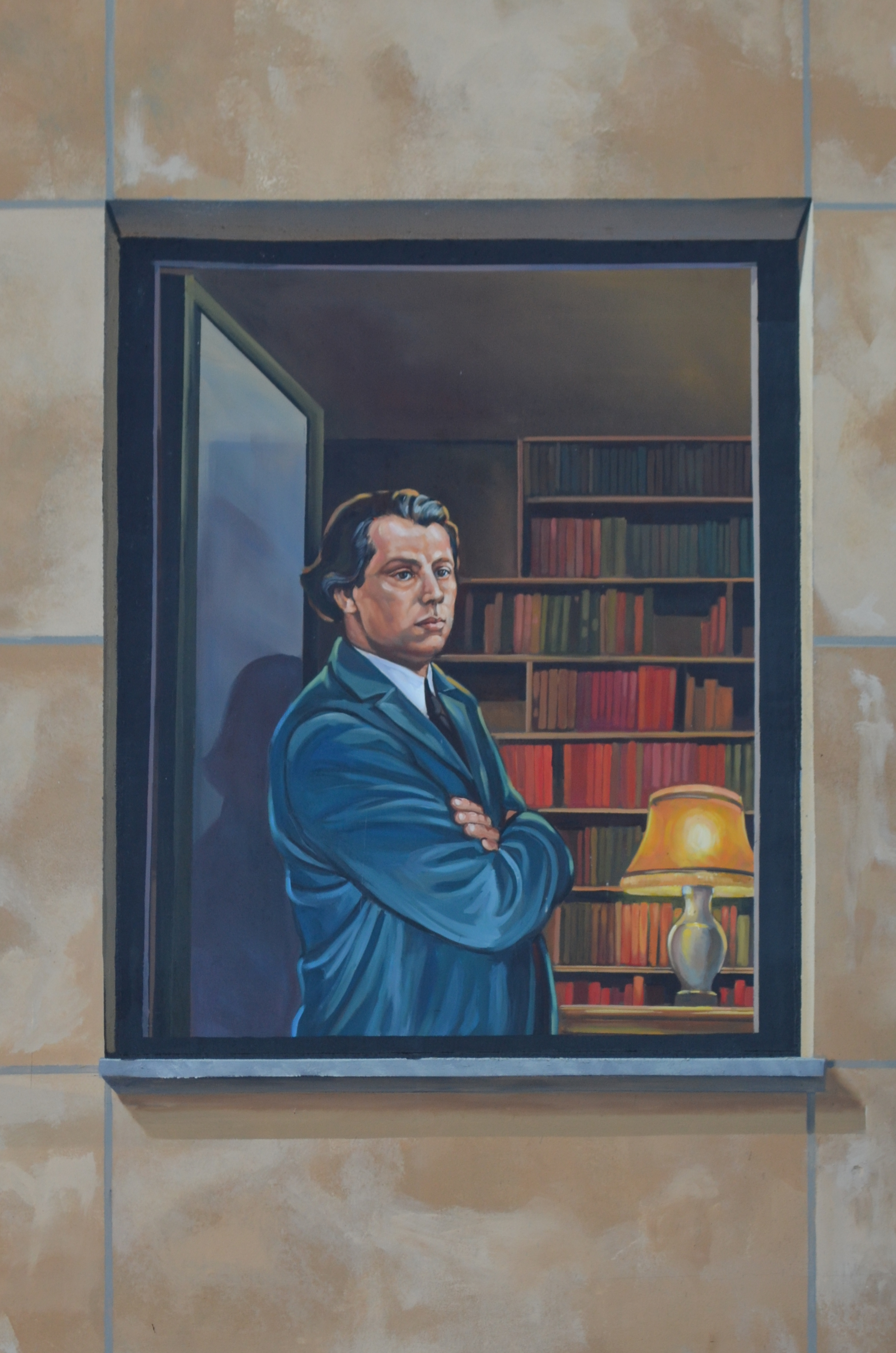

Governor of Namur
- In office 16 April 1937 – 17 August 1940
- Preceded by: Pierre de Gaiffier d'Hestroy
- Succeeded by: Georges Devos (Wartime); Robert Gruslin (Post-War)

Minister of Justice
- In office 13 June 1936 – 14 April 1937
- Prime Minister: Paul van Zeeland
- Preceded by: Eugène Soudan
- Succeeded by: Hubert Pierlot
- In office 12 June 1934 – 25 March 1935
- Prime Minister: Charles de Broqueville; Georges Theunis
- Preceded by: Paul-Émile Janson
- Succeeded by: Eugène Soudan

Minister of Education
- In office 25 March 1935 – 13 June 1936
- Prime Minister: Paul van Zeeland
- Preceded by: Jules Hiernaux
- Succeeded by: Julius Hoste Jr.

Minister of Civil Service
- In office 20 May 1931 – 17 December 1932
- Prime Minister: Henri Jaspar; Jules Renkin; Charles de Broqueville
- Preceded by: Pierre Forthomme
- Succeeded by: Prosper Poullet

Member of the Chamber of Representatives
- In office 1929–1937
- In office 1921–1925

Personal details
- Born: 10 June 1890 Namur, Belgium
- Died: 1 February 1944 (Aged 53) Namur, Belgium
- Party: Liberal Party
- Spouse: Juliette Bilande
- Education: University of Liège

François Bovesse (French pronunciation: [fʁɑ̃swa bɔvɛs]; 10 June 1890 - 1 February 1944) was a Belgian politician and writer who served as Minister of Justice and Governor of Namur as a member of the Liberal Party before his assassination at the hands of Belgian Rexists in 1944.

== Early life ==
Bovesse was born on 10 June 1890 in Namur, Belgium, to François Bovesse (1865–1933) and Jeanne Richard-Jacques (1870–1963). He graduated from the Athénée de Namur in 1907 and married Juliette Bilande (1889–1961) in 1912. Bovesse worked as an employee in the tax administration while studying law at the University of Liège. He graduated with a Doctor of Law in 1914. That same year World War I broke out and Bovesse served in the Belgian Army during the Yser campaign. After being wounded in action, Bovesse was sent to Calais to serve as a military auditor. Following the end of the war, Bovesse was admitted to the bar in 1919 and began practicing law in Namur.

== Career ==
Bovesse first served as a member of the city council of Namur from 1921 to 1932 for the Liberal Party. He also served as an alderman of Namur from 1927 to 1929. At the same time, Bovesse served in the Belgian Chamber of Representatives from 1921 to 1925 and again from 1929 to 1937 for the Namur area. Bovesse served during three cabinets as Minister of Civil Service from 1931 to 1932. Bovesse was twice Minister of Justice, first from 1934 to 1935 and again from 1936 to 1937. In between those two terms, Bovesse served as Minister of Education from 1935 to 1936. In 1937, Bovesse became the governor of Namur.

== World War II and death ==
Following the German invasion of Belgium in May 1940, Bovesse initially fled Belgium alongside the Belgian government to France, where he was named high commissioner in Hérault so he could assist fellow Belgian refugees. After the fall of France, Bovesse returned to Belgium in September 1940 only to find that the German forces which had occupied Belgium had replaced him as governor on 17 August 1940. After his forced removal from the governorship, Bovesse returned to practicing law.

Bovesse took an anti-fascist stance against the Nazi leadership in occupied Belgium and everyone who collaborated with them, thereby quickly becoming a symbol of civil resistance. For his actions he was sentenced to six months in prison and also became a target of the collaborating Rexist Party. The leader of the Rexist Party of Namur was murdered alongside his wife on 30 January 1944, and the Rexists were out for revenge, which led them to select Bovesse as their target. On 1 February 1944, five men affiliated with the Rexist Party and the SS went to Bovesse's home in Namur and wanted to force him in their truck at gunpoint so they could kill him elsewhere. Bovesse, however, put up a fight which caused the men to open fire before fleeing, striking Bovesse and mortally wounding him. Two of the assassins did not survive the war, while the remaining three were captured after the war and executed by firing squad in 1946.
