= Adolphe Van Glabbeke =

Belgian politician (1904–1959)

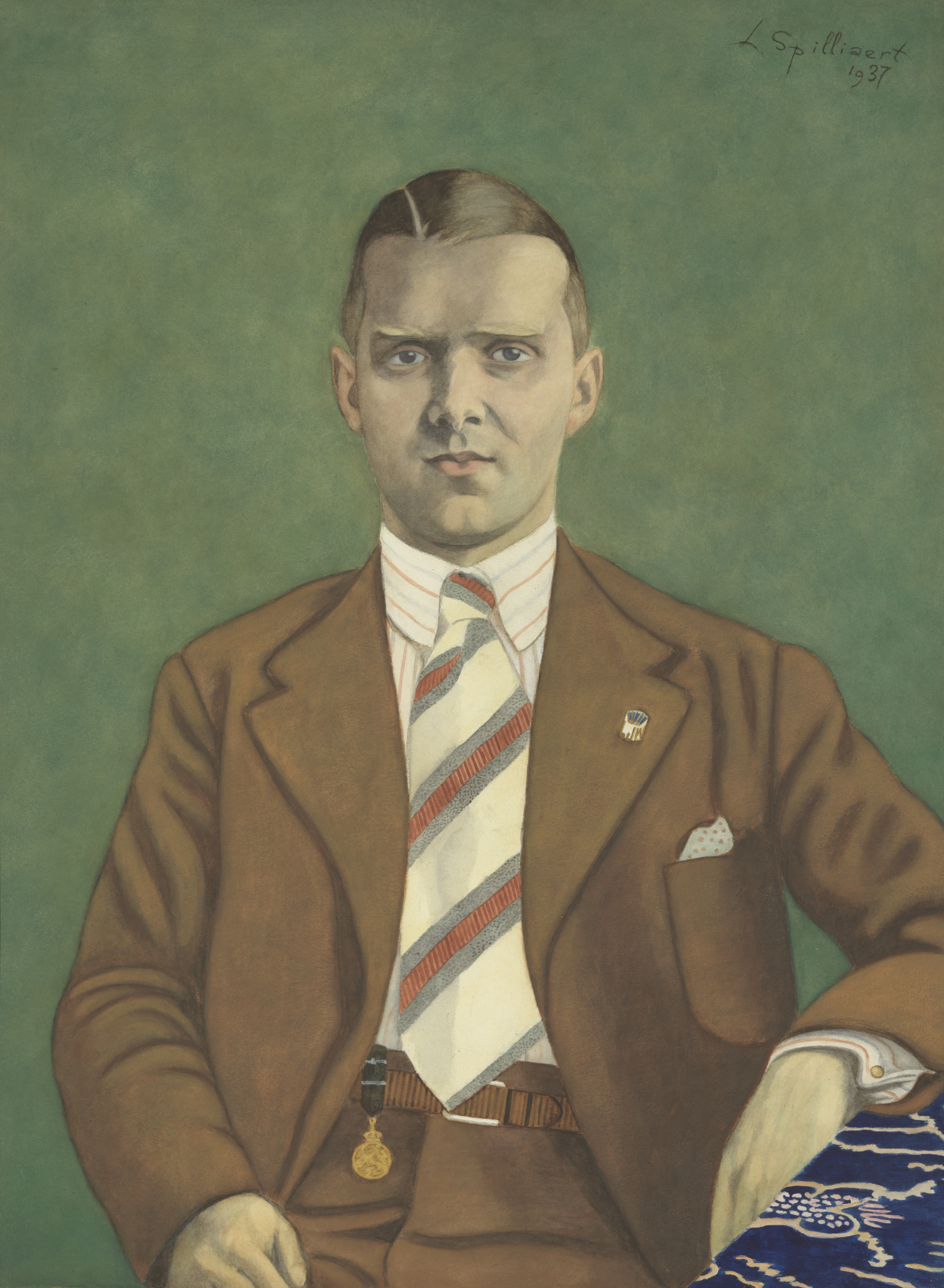

Mayor of Ostend
- In office 10 January 1953 – 6 February 1959
- Preceded by: Louis Vandendriessche
- Succeeded by: Jan Piers

Secretary of State of Public Works
- In office 23 April 1954 – 14 January 1955
- Prime Minister: Achiel Van Acker
- Preceded by: Oscar Behogne
- Succeeded by: Omer Vanaudenhove

Minister of Public Health
- In office 11 August 1949 – 8 June 1950
- Prime Minister: Gaston Eyskens
- Preceded by: François-Xavier van der Straten-Waillet
- Succeeded by: Alfred De Taeye

Minister of Justice
- In office 31 March 1946 – 3 August 1946
- Prime Minister: Achiel Van Acker
- Preceded by: Henri Rolin
- Succeeded by: Albert Lilar

Minister of the Interior
- In office 12 February 1945 – 13 March 1946
- Prime Minister: Achiel Van Acker
- Preceded by: Edmond Ronse
- Succeeded by: Joseph Merlot

Member of the Chamber of Representatives
- In office 1936–1959

Personal details
- Born: 8 August 1904 Ostend, West Flanders, Belgium
- Died: 5 July 1959 (Aged 54) Zanzibar, Tanzania
- Party: Liberal Party
- Education: Université libre de Bruxelles

Adolphe Gustave Maximilien Ernest Van Glabbeke (8 August 1904 – 5 July 1959) was a Belgian politician from the Liberal Party who served in several government positions including Minister of Justice and Minister of the Interior, as well as serving as the Mayor of Ostend from 1953 to 1959.

== Early life ==
Van Glabbeke was born on 8 August 1904 in Ostend, West Flanders, Belgium to sea Captain Gustave Alexandre Van Glabbeke and Angèle Ernestine Huyghe. He studied law at the Université libre de Bruxelles and graduated with a degree in maritime law and financial science. He also studied at Princeton University thanks to a scholarship before beginning his career as a lawyer in 1929.

== Career ==
Van Glabbeke first worked for the Ministry of the Colonies as a private secretary in 1930 while he became active in the Liberal Party. It was for that party that he was elected to the Chamber of Representatives in 1936 for the Ostend-Veurne-Diksmuide area. He remained in this position throughout the occupation of Belgium in World War II and was even an active member of the Belgian resistance. Following the liberation of Belgium in 1944, Van Glabbeke became the chairman of the General Confederation of Liberal Trade Unions of Belgium, a position which he would hold until 1959. During a debate concerning the Royal question in 1950, Van Glabbeke who was opposed to the return of King Leopold III was involved in a fistfight with Les Engagés politician Jules Descampe who was in favour of the King's return.

Van Glabbeke achieved his first ministry appointment in the Government of Prime Minister Achille Van Acker, and was appointed Minister of the Interior on 12 February 1945. He held the position until March 1946 when he was instead appointed as Minister of Justice until the appointment of the next Government in August 1946. Van Glabbeke would find work in the Government again in 1949, when he was appointed Minister of Public Health by Prime Minister Gaston Eyskens. He held the position until 1950 and was elected as a city council member in Ostend two years later. That same year, Van Glabbeke served as an Alderman in Ostend until his election as Mayor of Ostend in 1953. Van Glabbeke would end up holding one more ministry position as he was appointed Secretary of State of Public Works by Prime Minister Achille Van Acker in 1954, however Van Glabbeke resigned from the post the next year due to allegations of favouring his in-laws in state assignments.

== Death ==
Van Glabbeke's term as Mayor of Ostend ended on 6 February 1959, but he was still serving as a Member of the Chamber of Representatives and chairman of the General Confederation of Liberal Trade Unions of Belgium when he travelled to Zanzibar and Belgian Congo on a diplomatic mission that same year. While in Zanzibar following his visit to Leopoldville, Van Glabbeke died unexpectedly on 5 July 1959 at the age of 54. His body was brought back to Belgium and Buried in Ostend.
