= Kortrijk-Roeselare-Tielt (Chamber of Representatives constituency) =

Belgian political subdivision

Kortrijk-Roeselare-Tielt was a constituency used to elect members of the Belgian Chamber of Representatives between 1995 and 2003.

== Representatives ==
Election	Representative (Party)	Representative (Party)	Representative (Party)	Representative (Party)	Representative (Party)	Representative (Party)	Representative (Party)	Representative (Party)
1995	Formed from a merger of Kortrijk and Roeselare-Tielt							
1995	Daniël Vanpoucke (CVP)	Geert Bourgeois (VU)	Gisèle Gardeyn-Debever (CVP)	Joris Huysentruyt (VB)	Myriam Vanlerberghe (PS)	Patrick Van Gheluwe (PS)	Pierre Lano (VLD)	Stefaan De Clerck (CVP)
1999	Daniël Vanpoucke (CVP)	Geert Bourgeois (VU)	Roel Deseyn (CVP)	Roger Bouteca (VB)	Anne-Mie Descheemaeker (Agalev)	Els Haegeman (PS)	Pierre Lano (VLD)	Trees Pieters (CVP)
