= List of protected heritage sites in Mouscron =

This table shows an overview of the protected heritage sites in the Walloon town Mouscron. This list is part of Belgium's national heritage.

Object	Year/architect	Town/section	Address	Coordinates	Number^{?}	Image
Church of Saint-Barthelemy: four mausoleums ^{(nl)} ^{(fr)}		Mouscron		50.744416°N 3.215319°E	54007-CLT-0001-01	Kerk Saint-Barthélémy: vier mausoleums
Castle of the Counts ^{(nl)} ^{(fr)}		Mouscron	avenue du château n°200	50.749260°N 3.222978°E	54007-CLT-0003-01	Kasteel van de Graven
Castle of the Counts and environment ^{(nl)} ^{(fr)}		Mouscron		50.750012°N 3.222446°E	54007-CLT-0004-01	Kasteel van de Graven en omgeving
Organs of the church of Saint-Barthélemy ^{(nl)} ^{(fr)}		Mouscron		50.744357°N 3.215062°E	54007-CLT-0005-01	Orgels van de kerk Saint-Barthélémy
Picardy house: tile panels of the former ballroom ^{(nl)} ^{(fr)}		Mouscron	rue du Val, n°1	50.743554°N 3.212080°E	54007-CLT-0006-01	Picardisch Huis: muurpanelen in tegels van de oude balzaal op de eerste verdieping
Tower of the old church ^{(nl)} ^{(fr)}		Dottignies		50.727940°N 3.305544°E	54007-CLT-0007-01	Toren van de oude kerk
Mouscron bandstand ^{(fr)}	1937-1938	Mouscron	Parc communal de Mouscron	50.740005°N 3.208058°E	54007-CLT-0009-01	

== See also ==
- List of protected heritage sites in Hainaut (province)
- Mouscron
