= Jean-Pierre Detremmerie =

Belgian politician (1940–2016)

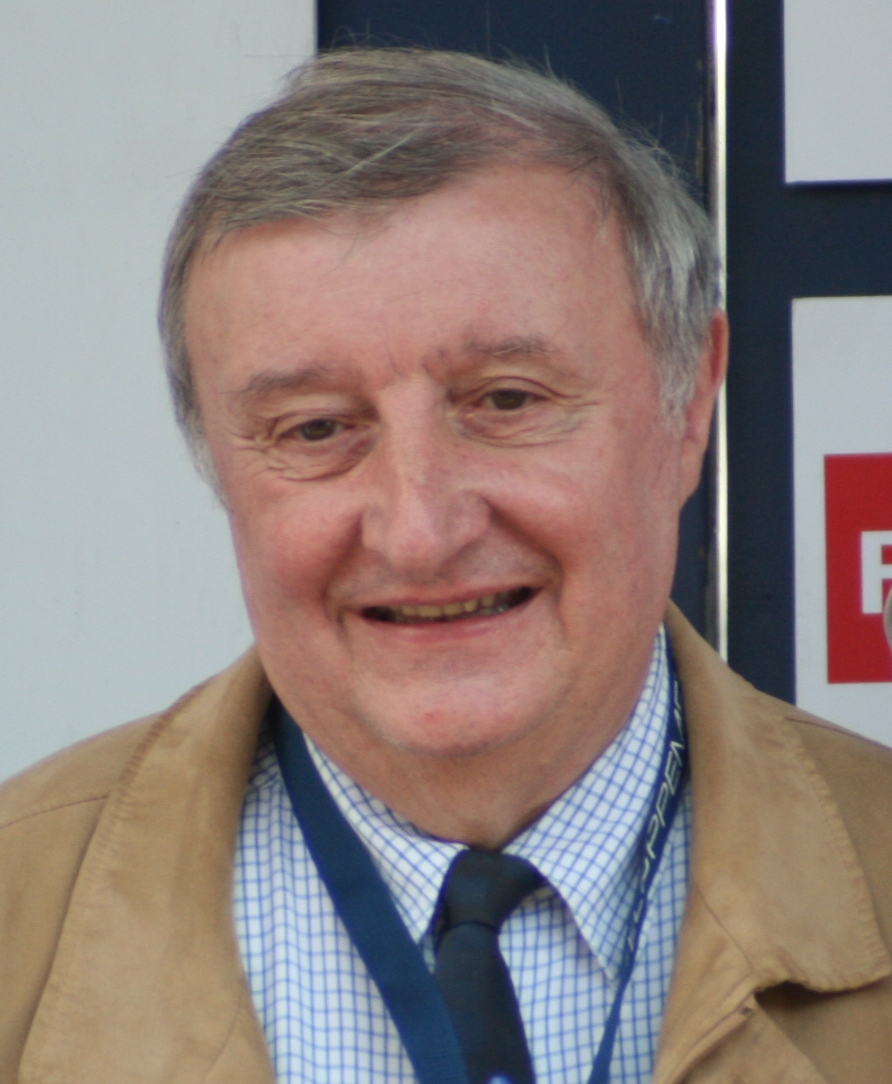
- Jean-Pierre Detremmerie Thomas Ducroquet (2008)
- Born: 10 October 1940; Mouscron, Hainaut, Belgium
- Died: 21 February 2016 (aged 75); Mouscron, Hainaut, Belgium
- Occupations: Politician; Mayor of Mouscron; President of R.E. Mouscron (football club)
- Political party: cdH
- Spouse: Françoise Detremmerie-Verheve
- Children: Damien Detremmerie Sébastien Detremmerie

Jean-Pierre Detremmerie (10 October 1940 – 20/21 February 2016) was a Belgian politician and long serving former mayor of Mouscron. He was active within the francophone Christian Democratic Party (cdH) for many years, and a Member of Parliament between 1981 and 2003.

He was known to colleagues, informally, as "Detrem".

On the morning of 21 February 2016 his body was found by his wife. It was determined that he had committed suicide by hanging, having suffered from depression for several years. Since December 2011 he had been facing criminal charges in connection with the allegedly opaque financial arrangements of his local football club, which he formerly chaired.

== Life ==
=== Provenance and early years ===
Jean-Pierre Detremmerie was born in Mouscron, traditionally a French speaking textile manufacturing town sandwiched between the border with France to the south, and the Dutch language speaking province of Eastern Flanders to the north, in the western part of occupied Belgium. He began his professional career as a teacher of germanic languages at the Saint Augustine College in nearby Enghien.

=== Municipal politics ===
He quickly became active within the French speaking Christian Democratic Party (Parti social chrétien / PSC as it was known before 2001), and in 1971 he was elected for the party as a town councillor in Mouscron. Following local government boundary changes, he became the alderman responsible for youth and sport in the newly enlarged municipality, serving under the mayor Robert Devos. In February 1980 it was Jean-Pierre Detremmerie who succeeded Devos as mayor of Mouscron. As mayor he is credited with having attracted a large number of new businesses to Mouscron, and overseeing a sustained period of remarkable economic resurgence, which came after decades of steady decline between the 1930s and the 1970s, as the town's fortunes mirrored those of the shrinking Belgians textiles industry on which it had long since come to depend. Detremmerie's term as mayor lasted a remarkable 26 years. As he became engulfed in allegations of financial malfeasance (which he robustly contested during the decade that followed) he was succeeded in December 2006 by Alfred Gadenne.

=== National politics ===
On the national stage, in February 1981 he also took over from Devos as a member of the lower house of the Belgian Parliament, representing his local electoral district of Doornik-Aat-Moeskroen / Tournai-Ath-Mouscron. His maiden speech concerned a proposal in the 1981 legislative programme to increase the control of central government over the police. "Govern from a distance: administer locally", became a recurring leitmotif of his political approach. He was known to his admirers as a master of the telling phrase. He remained a member of parliament till April 2003.

=== Wallon politics ===
Between 1981 and 1995, and more briefly between 2004 and 2005, he was also a member of the Wallonia Parliament, which meets in Namur, and of the Wallonia Parliament's Brussels mirror image, the Parliament of the French Community: these have a political remit across the French and German speaking parts of Belgium. In April 2005 he resigned from the Wallonia parliament in favour of Damien Yzerbyt (1963-2014).

=== Troubles ===
In 2005 Detremmerie's fortunes went into sharp reverse, which was reflected by various allegations of misfeasance which he himself has always contested. The driving issue involved his local football club, Royal Excelsior Mouscron, of which for many years Detremmerie was the president. In 2004–05 Mouscron reached fifth position in the premier league rankings, and in 2006 the club celebrated its tenth year in the Belgian premier league. By that time it had become apparent that the club had been overspending, however, and was badly overburdened by debt: although it remained a premier league club till the end, for the rest of the decade it sat resolutely in the bottom half of the league, with a corresponding decline in ticket sales. On 28 December 2009, Mouscron announced its third forfeit in a row because of enduring financial problems, and was thus, according to Belgian league rules, excluded from competition, with all its previous results in the ongoing competition being scrapped. The club in its current form ceased to exist, with all its players (and staff) becoming free agents.

“On ne peut pas nier qu’il a fait des choses incroyables pour la ville de Mouscron. C’est également lui qui est venu chercher tous les membres de la majorité actuelle ou presque, dont moi. C’est en tout cas une fin horrible, qui plus est lorsque l’on a eu une vie comme la sienne”

"No one can gainsay the amazing things that he has done for Mouscron. It is also the case that he is the one who recruited almost all the present cdH members of the municipal council, including myself. It is in any event a horrible end, the more so because it comes after a life such as his"

Alfred Gadenne, who succeeded Jean-Pierre Detremmier as mayor of Mouscron, quoted in La Libre Belgique
(21 February 2016)

Responding to the looming financial crisis Detremmerie resigned his presidency of the club in 2005, but remained closely involved in trying to save it, successfully attracting massive cash injections, notably from the wealthy businessman Philippe Dufermont who took over the presidency. However, the financial rescue proved temporary, and in 2011 Detremmerie's role became the subject of criminal charges involving alleged covert funding, forgery, making used of forged documents with intent to defraud, misappropriation and fraudulent conversion.

During the next few years he resigned his various political and business functions. In February 2007 he was obliged to resign from the local branch of the Christian Democratic Party (cdH). He remained a member of the municipal council sitting as an independent member, however, till 2009 when he finally resigned from all his remaining political duties in order to devote himself to his family. It was also at this point that he resigned from the chairmanship of the local utilities supplier, "SIMOGEL".

Jean-Pierre Detremmerie committed suicide during the night of 20/21 February.
