= Roeselare-Tielt (Chamber of Representatives constituency) =

Former Belgian national legislative constituency

Roeselare-Tielt was a constituency used to elect members of the Belgian Chamber of Representatives between 1900 and 1991.

== Representatives ==
Election	Representative (Party)	Representative (Party)	Representative (Party)	Representative (Party)	Representative (Party)
1900	Formed from a merger of Roeselare and Tielt				
1900	Auguste Beernaert (Catholic)	Charles Gillès de Pelichy (Catholic)	Maurice Van der Bruggen (Catholic)	Valère Vanden Bogaerde (Catholic)	4 seats
1904	Auguste Beernaert (Catholic)	Charles Gillès de Pelichy (Catholic)	Maurice Van der Bruggen (Catholic)	Julien Delbeke (Catholic)	4 seats
1908	Auguste Beernaert (Catholic)	Charles Gillès de Pelichy (Catholic)	Aloys Van de Vyvere (Catholic)	Julien Delbeke (Catholic)	4 seats
1912	Emile Goethals (Catholic)	Charles Gillès de Pelichy (Catholic)	Aloys Van de Vyvere (Catholic)	Julien Delbeke (Catholic)	Jan Mahieu Liebaert (Catholic)
1919	Adiel Dierkens (PS)	Gustave Sap (Catholic)	Aloys Van de Vyvere (Catholic)	Pieter Isidore De Greve (Catholic)	Jan Mahieu Liebaert (Catholic)
1921	Adiel Dierkens (PS)	Gustave Sap (Catholic)	Aloys Van de Vyvere (Catholic)	Pieter Isidore De Greve (Catholic)	Joris Van Severen (Frontpartij)
1925	Adiel Dierkens (PS)	Gustave Sap (Catholic)	Aloys Van de Vyvere (Catholic)	Emile Allewaert (Catholic)	Joris Van Severen (Frontpartij)
1929	Adiel Dierkens (PS)	Gustave Sap (Catholic)	Adolf De Jaegere (Catholic)	Emile Allewaert (Catholic)	René Desmedt (Catholic)
1932	Adiel Dierkens (PS)	Gustave Sap (Catholic)	Adolf De Jaegere (Catholic)	Emile Allewaert (Catholic)	René Desmedt (Catholic)
1936	Adiel Dierkens (PS)	Gustave Sap (Catholic)	Reimond Tollenaere (VNV)	Emile Allewaert (Catholic)	4 seats
1939	Adiel Dierkens (PS)	Camiel Verhamme (Catholic)	Reimond Tollenaere (VNV)	Emile Allewaert (Catholic)	4 seats
1946	Arthur Sercu (BSP)	Camiel Verhamme (Catholic)	Albert De Gryse (CVP)	Guido Gillès de Pelichy (CVP)	4 seats
1949	Arthur Sercu (BSP)	Camiel Verhamme (Catholic)	Albert De Gryse (CVP)	Guido Gillès de Pelichy (CVP)	Magdalena Van Daele-Huys (CVP)
1950	Arthur Sercu (BSP)	Camiel Verhamme (Catholic)	Albert De Gryse (CVP)	Guido Gillès de Pelichy (CVP)	Magdalena Van Daele-Huys (CVP)
1954	Arthur Sercu (BSP)	Camiel Verhamme (Catholic)	Albert De Gryse (CVP)	Guido Gillès de Pelichy (CVP)	Magdalena Van Daele-Huys (CVP)
1958	Arthur Sercu (BSP)	Camiel Verhamme (Catholic)	Albert De Gryse (CVP)	Guido Gillès de Pelichy (CVP)	Magdalena Van Daele-Huys (CVP)
1961	Gustaaf Nyffels (BSP)	Honoraat Callebert (CVP)	Albert De Gryse (CVP)	Guido Gillès de Pelichy (CVP)	Magdalena Van Daele-Huys (CVP)
1965	Gustaaf Nyffels (BSP)	Honoraat Callebert (CVP)	Albert De Gryse (CVP)	Mik Babylon (VU)	Robert Gheysen (CVP)
1968	Gustaaf Nyffels (BSP)	Honoraat Callebert (CVP)	Albert De Gryse (CVP)	Mik Babylon (VU)	Robert Gheysen (CVP)
1971	Gustaaf Nyffels (BSP)	André Bourgeois (CVP)	Erik Vankeirsbilck (CVP)	Mik Babylon (VU)	Robert Gheysen (CVP)
1974	Gustaaf Nyffels (BSP)	André Bourgeois (CVP)	Erik Vankeirsbilck (CVP)	Mik Babylon (VU)	Robert Gheysen (CVP)
1977	Gustaaf Nyffels (BSP)	Jozef Demeyere (BSP)	Erik Vankeirsbilck (CVP)	Mik Babylon (VU)	Robert Gheysen (CVP)
1978	Gustaaf Nyffels (BSP)	André Bourgeois (CVP)	Erik Vankeirsbilck (CVP)	Lode Van Biervliet (VU)	Robert Gheysen (CVP)
1981	Roger Van Steenkiste (PS)	André Bourgeois (CVP)	Erik Vankeirsbilck (CVP)	Lode Van Biervliet (VU)	Louis Bril (PVV)
1985	Roger Van Steenkiste (PS)	André Bourgeois (CVP)	Erik Vankeirsbilck (CVP)	Jean-Pierre Pillaert (VU)	Louis Bril (PVV)
1988	Patrick Hostekint (PS)	André Bourgeois (CVP)	Erik Vankeirsbilck (CVP)	Jean-Pierre Pillaert (VU)	Louis Bril (PVV)
1991	Patrick Hostekint (PS)	André Bourgeois (CVP)	Daniël Vanpoucke (CVP)	Fons Vergote (PVV)	Louis Bril (PVV)
1995	Merged into Kortrijk-Roeselare-Tielt				
