= Roeselare (Chamber of Representatives constituency) =

Belgian political subdivision

Roselare was a constituency used to elect members of the Belgian Chamber of Representatives between 1831 and 1900.

== Representatives ==
Election	Representative (Party)	Representative (Party)
1831	Alexander Rodenbach (Catholic)	Désiré de Haerne (Catholic)
1833	Alexander Rodenbach (Catholic)	Jacques Wallaert (Catholic)
1837	Alexander Rodenbach (Catholic)	Jacques Wallaert (Catholic)
1841	Alexander Rodenbach (Catholic)	Jacques Wallaert (Catholic)
1845	Alexander Rodenbach (Catholic)	Jacques Wallaert (Catholic)
1848	Alexander Rodenbach (Catholic)	Barthélémy Dumortier (Catholic)
1852	Alexander Rodenbach (Catholic)	Barthélémy Dumortier (Catholic)
1856	Alexander Rodenbach (Catholic)	Barthélémy Dumortier (Catholic)
1857	Alexander Rodenbach (Catholic)	Barthélémy Dumortier (Catholic)
1861	Alexander Rodenbach (Catholic)	Barthélémy Dumortier (Catholic)
1864	Alexander Rodenbach (Catholic)	Barthélémy Dumortier (Catholic)
1868	Alberic Descantons de Montblanc (Catholic)	Barthélémy Dumortier (Catholic)
1870	Alberic Descantons de Montblanc (Catholic)	Barthélémy Dumortier (Catholic)
1874	Alberic Descantons de Montblanc (Catholic)	Barthélémy Dumortier (Catholic)
1878	Alberic Descantons de Montblanc (Catholic)	Fernand de Jonghe d'Ardoye (Catholic)
1882	Alberic Descantons de Montblanc (Catholic)	Fernand de Jonghe d'Ardoye (Catholic)
1886	Alberic Descantons de Montblanc (Catholic)	Fernand de Jonghe d'Ardoye (Catholic)
1890	Alberic Descantons de Montblanc (Catholic)	Fernand de Jonghe d'Ardoye (Catholic)
1892	Adrien Spillebout (Catholic)	Fernand de Jonghe d'Ardoye (Catholic)
1894	Adrien Spillebout (Catholic)	Fernand de Jonghe d'Ardoye (Catholic)
1898	Adrien Spillebout (Catholic)	Fernand de Jonghe d'Ardoye (Catholic)
1900	Merged into Roeselare-Tielt	
