= Georgette Brenez =

Belgian politician (1930–2010)

Member of the Walloon Regional Council
- In office 15 October 1980 – 3 September 1985

Member of the Chamber of Representatives
- In office 28 March 1974 – 3 September 1985
- Constituency: Tournai-Ath-Mouscron

Personal details
- Born: 5 November 1930; Saint-Ghislain, Belgium
- Died: 9 January 2010 (aged 79); Ath, Belgium
- Political party: Socialist Party

Georgette Brenez (5 November 1930 – 9 January 2010) was a Belgian politician and activist in the Walloon Movement. She was a member of the Chamber of Representatives from 1974 to 1985 and a member of the Walloon Regional Council from 1980 to 1985. She was a member of the Socialist Party.

== Early life ==
Brenez was born on 5 November 1930 in Tertre, a district in the city of Saint-Ghislain. Following the end of World War II, she was introduced to the Walloon Movement by her father and later joined Wallonie Libre. She began working as the assistant for a seamstress in 1947, a position that she held until she joined the Établissements Bertiau-Delacroix in 1949. She later worked as the director of a summer camp.

She joined the Femmes prévoyantes socialistes (FPS) of Saint-Ghislain in 1947, serving as the regional secretary until 1956. She was a volunteer with the federal office of the Belgian Socialist Party (PSB) in Dinant from 1957 to 1959, when she moved to Ath. She then became a federal secretary with the FPS of Tournai-Ath in 1959 and then regional president in 1985. She was appointed as the national president in 1990. She was a board member of the Socialist Mutualities, provincial vice president of the National Children's Society (O.N.E.), and a member of the Higher Committee of the O.N.E. and of the Family.

== Political career ==
Brenez was elected as a municipal councillor for Ath in 1970. She was the first woman elected as a local councillor in Ath. She became first alderman in charge of youth, family and sports from 1971 to 1976 and then the alderman for education, family and the middle classes from 1977 to 1985, during the merging of the municipalities. She was elected in the 1974 general election on 10 March 1974 as a representative in the Chamber of Representatives for the constituency of Tournai-Ath-Mouscron. She held the position from 28 March 1974 until 3 September 1985.

She was one of the few female politicians at the time and briefly served as the only female socialist representative in Wallonia. Brenez was a member of the Council of the French Community from 4 April 1974 to 3 September 1985, and as a secretary of the Council from 1981 to 1985. She voted in favour of the creation of the regional assemblies in August 1980 and served on the Walloon Regional Council from 15 October 1980 to 3 September 1985. She was particularly interested in public health, family, culture, employment and social security.

She was first alderman of Ath from 1985 to 1997 and then the acting mayor of Ath from February 1992 to January 1994, while Guy Spitaels was serving as the Minister-President of Wallonia, and again briefly during the spring of 1997.

== Personal life ==
Brenez left politics in 1997. She died on 9 January 2010 in Ath.
