= Tielt (Chamber of Representatives constituency) =

Belgian political subdivision

Tielt was a constituency used to elect members of the Belgian Chamber of Representatives between 1831 and 1900.

== Representatives ==
Election	Representative (Party)	Representative (Party)
1831	Charles de Roo (Catholic)	Léon de Foere (Catholic)
1833	Charles de Roo (Catholic)	Léon de Foere (Catholic)
1837	Charles de Roo (Catholic)	Léon de Foere (Catholic)
1841	Charles de Roo (Catholic)	Léon de Foere (Catholic)
1845	Charles de Roo (Catholic)	Léon de Foere (Catholic)
1848	Felix de Mûelenaere (Catholic)	Philippe Le Bailly de Tilleghem (Catholic)
1852	Felix de Mûelenaere (Catholic)	Philippe Le Bailly de Tilleghem (Catholic)
1856	Felix de Mûelenaere (Catholic)	Philippe Le Bailly de Tilleghem (Catholic)
1857	Felix de Mûelenaere (Catholic)	Philippe Le Bailly de Tilleghem (Catholic)
1861	Gustave de Mûelenaere (Catholic)	Philippe Le Bailly de Tilleghem (Catholic)
1864	Gustave de Mûelenaere (Catholic)	Philippe Le Bailly de Tilleghem (Catholic)
1868	Gustave de Mûelenaere (Catholic)	Adile Eugène Mulle de ter Schueren (Catholic)
1870	Gustave de Mûelenaere (Catholic)	Adile Eugène Mulle de ter Schueren (Catholic)
1874	Auguste Beernaert (Catholic)	Adile Eugène Mulle de ter Schueren (Catholic)
1878	Auguste Beernaert (Catholic)	Adile Eugène Mulle de ter Schueren (Catholic)
1882	Auguste Beernaert (Catholic)	Adile Eugène Mulle de ter Schueren (Catholic)
1886	Auguste Beernaert (Catholic)	Maurice Van der Bruggen (Catholic)
1890	Auguste Beernaert (Catholic)	Maurice Van der Bruggen (Catholic)
1892	Auguste Beernaert (Catholic)	Maurice Van der Bruggen (Catholic)
1894	Auguste Beernaert (Catholic)	Maurice Van der Bruggen (Catholic)
1898	Auguste Beernaert (Catholic)	Maurice Van der Bruggen (Catholic)
1900	Merged into Roeselare-Tielt	
