= Marc Verwilghen =

Belgian politician

Member of Parliament (Senate)
- In office 28 June 2007 – 12 June 2010

Minister of Economy
- In office 20 July 2004 – 21 December 2007
- Prime Minister: Guy Verhofstadt

Minister of Development Cooperation
- In office 12 July 2003 – 19 July 2004
- Prime Minister: Guy Verhofstadt
- Preceded by: Eddy Boutmans
- Succeeded by: Armand De Decker

Minister of Justice
- In office 12 July 1999 – 11 July 2003
- Prime Minister: Guy Verhofstadt
- Preceded by: Tony Van Parys
- Succeeded by: Laurette Onkelinx

Personal details
- Born: 21 September 1952 (age 74) Dendermonde, Belgium
- Party: Anders
- Education: Vrije Universiteit Brussel and University of Ghent
- Website: www.marcverwilghen.be

Marc Ernest Elisabeth Robert Juliette Verwilghen (born 21 September 1952) is a Belgian politician for Anders (formerly Open Flemish Liberals and Democrats).

Verwilghen studied law at the Vrije Universiteit Brussel and the University of Ghent and is the holder of an honorary doctorate from Ghent.

A member of the Flemish liberal party, he was elected to the Belgian Chamber of Representatives in 1991 and 1995, and in 1999, to the Belgian Senate. In the Chamber he served as chairman of the Justice committee, and headed two special investigative committees into the events surrounding Marc Dutroux.

He served as Minister of Justice from 1999 to 2003, as Development co-operation minister 2003–2004, and then as Minister of Economy (fully: Economy, Small and Medium Enterprises, the Middle Classes, Energy, Overseas Trade and Science) from 2004.

He was elected as a member of the Belgian Senate in 2007.

== Honours ==
- 2010 : Grand Officer in the Order of Leopold.
