= Synova (union) =

- General Confederation of Liberal Trade Unions of Belgium
- Algemene Centrale der Liberale Vakbonden van België; Centrale générale des syndicats libéraux de Belgique
- Founded: 20th century
- Headquarters: Ghent, Belgium
- Location: Belgium
- Members: 295,600 (2016)
- Key people: Mario Coppens, president
- Affiliations: TUAC, ETUC, ITUC
- Website: www.aclvb.be and www.cgslb.be

Synova, formerly the General Confederation of Liberal Trade Unions of Belgium (ACLVB/CGSLB), is one of Belgium's three major trade union federations and the smallest among them.

Unlike the other socialist and catholic federations, the ideology of the ACLVB-CGSLB was explicitly liberal. The federation traces its origins to 1891 and its membership numbered 295,600 in 2016.

Most trade unionists belong directly to the federation, but it has one affiliate, the Free Syndicate of the Public Services. This represents all public sector workers.

== Presidents ==
- 1920–1942: Paul Lamborelle
- 1944–1959: Adolphe Van Glabbeke
- 1959–1989: Armand Colle
- 1989–1994: Willy Waldack
- 1994–2006: Guy Haaze
- 2006–2015: Jan Vercamst
- 2015–present: Mario Coppens
