= François-Xavier van der Straten-Waillet =

Belgian politician (1910–1998)

François-Xavier Georges Joseph Marie Ghislain baron van der Straten-Waillet
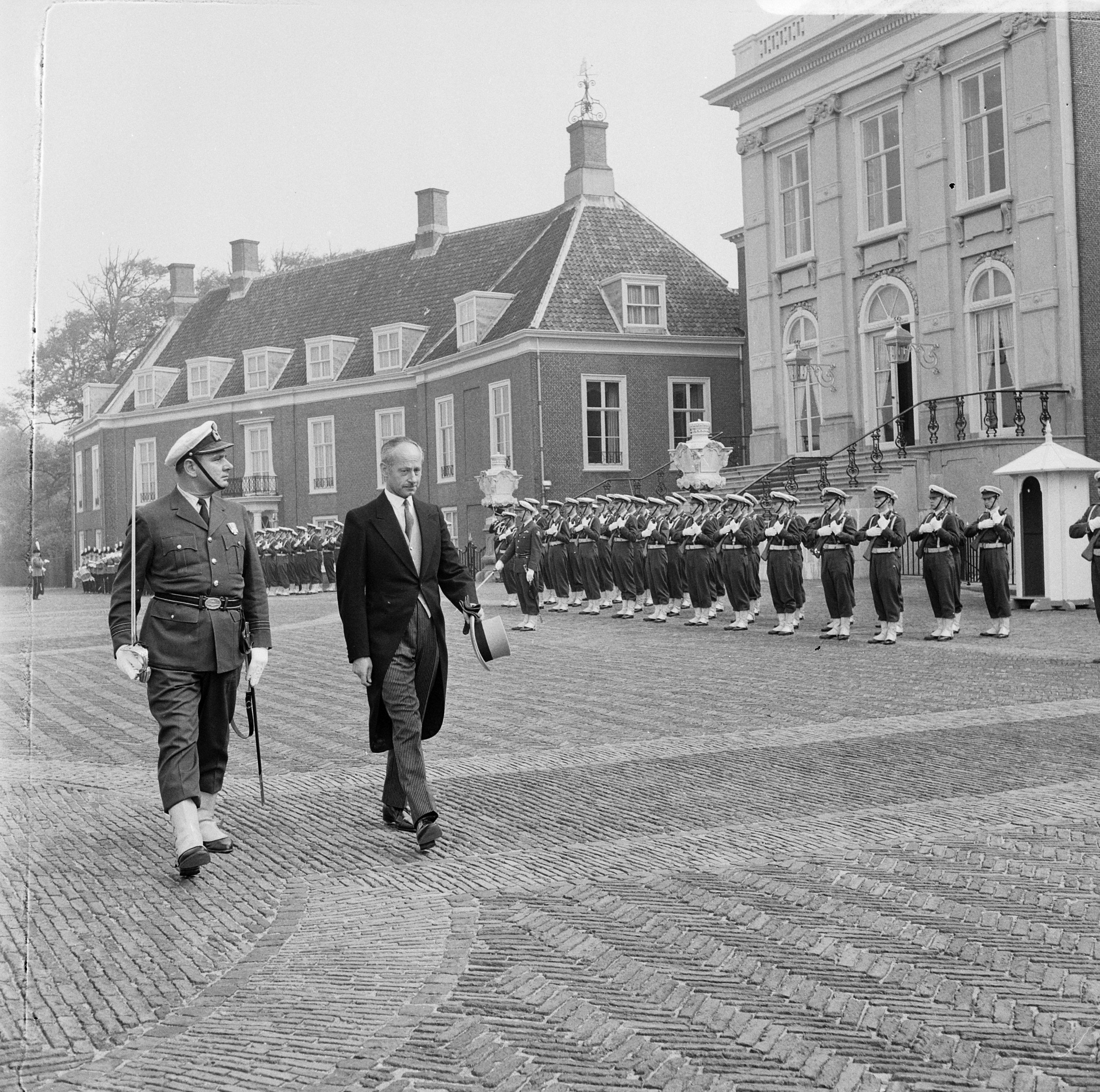
- van der Straten-Waillet as the Belgian ambassador to The Netherlands at Huis ten Bosch in 1966
- Monarch: Baudouin of Belgium

Ambassador of Belgium to Italy
- In office 1969–1975

Director-General political affairs at the Ministry of Foreign Affairs
- In office 1966–1969

Ambassador of Belgium to The Netherlands
- In office 1955–1966

Ambassador of Belgium to Argentina
- In office 1952–1955

Party chair of the Christian Social Party
- In office 1949–1950
- Preceded by: August De Schryver
- Succeeded by: Theo Lefèvre

Minister of Public Health
- In office 1948–1949
- Preceded by: Alfons Verbist
- Succeeded by: Adolphe Van Glabbeke

Minister of Foreign Trade
- In office 1947–1948
- Preceded by: Paul-Henri Spaak
- Succeeded by: Georges Moens de Fernig

Member of Parliament
- In office 1946–1952

Personal details
- Born: 22 January 1910 Antwerp, Belgium
- Died: 15 February 1998 (aged 88) Woluwe-Saint-Lambert, Belgium
- Party: Christian Social Party
- Spouse: Marie-Thérèse Moretus Plantin de Bouchout
- Education: Catholic University of Leuven

François-Xavier Georges Joseph Marie Ghislain baron van der Straten-Waillet (22 January 1910 - 15 February 1998) was a Belgian politician for the Christian Social Party.

== Biography ==
Coat of arms of the van der Straten family

Van der Straten-Waillet was a son of baron Alphonse van der Straten-Waillet (1884-1964), mayor of Westmalle, and of Irène Bosschaert de Bouwel (1885-1971). Van der Straten-Waillet married Marie-Thérèse Moretus Plantin de Bouchout (1912-2004) in 1935 and had six children. He obtained his doctorate in law at the Catholic University of Leuven in 1932 and became a director of the Verbond van Kristelijke Werkgevers (League of Christian Employers).

In 1946, he was elected as a Member of Parliament for the Christian Social Party for the Arrondissement of Antwerp. From 1949 to 1950, he was the second party chair, succeeding August De Schryver.

Van der Straten became a government minister twice: Minister of Foreign Trade from 1947 to 1948, and Minister of Public Health and Family from 1948 to 1949. Afterwards, he became an ambassador of Belgium to several countries, namely to Argentina (1952-1955), The Netherlands (1955-1966), and Italy (1969-1975).

== Publications ==
- van der Straten-Waillet, François-Xavier (1937). "Le statut de la propriété". Revue générale.
- van der Straten-Waillet, François-Xavier (1938). "La fonction sociale de la noblesse dans la société d'aujourd'hui". Revue générale.
- van der Straten-Waillet, François-Xavier (1950). "De la consultation populaire aux élections". Revue générale de Belgique.
