= Victor Maistriau =

Belgian lawyer

Victor Maistriau (1870–1962) was a Belgian lawyer who served as mayor of Mons for three terms between 1926 and 1954. He was the Minister of Justice in 1937.
