= Alexandre Rodenbach =

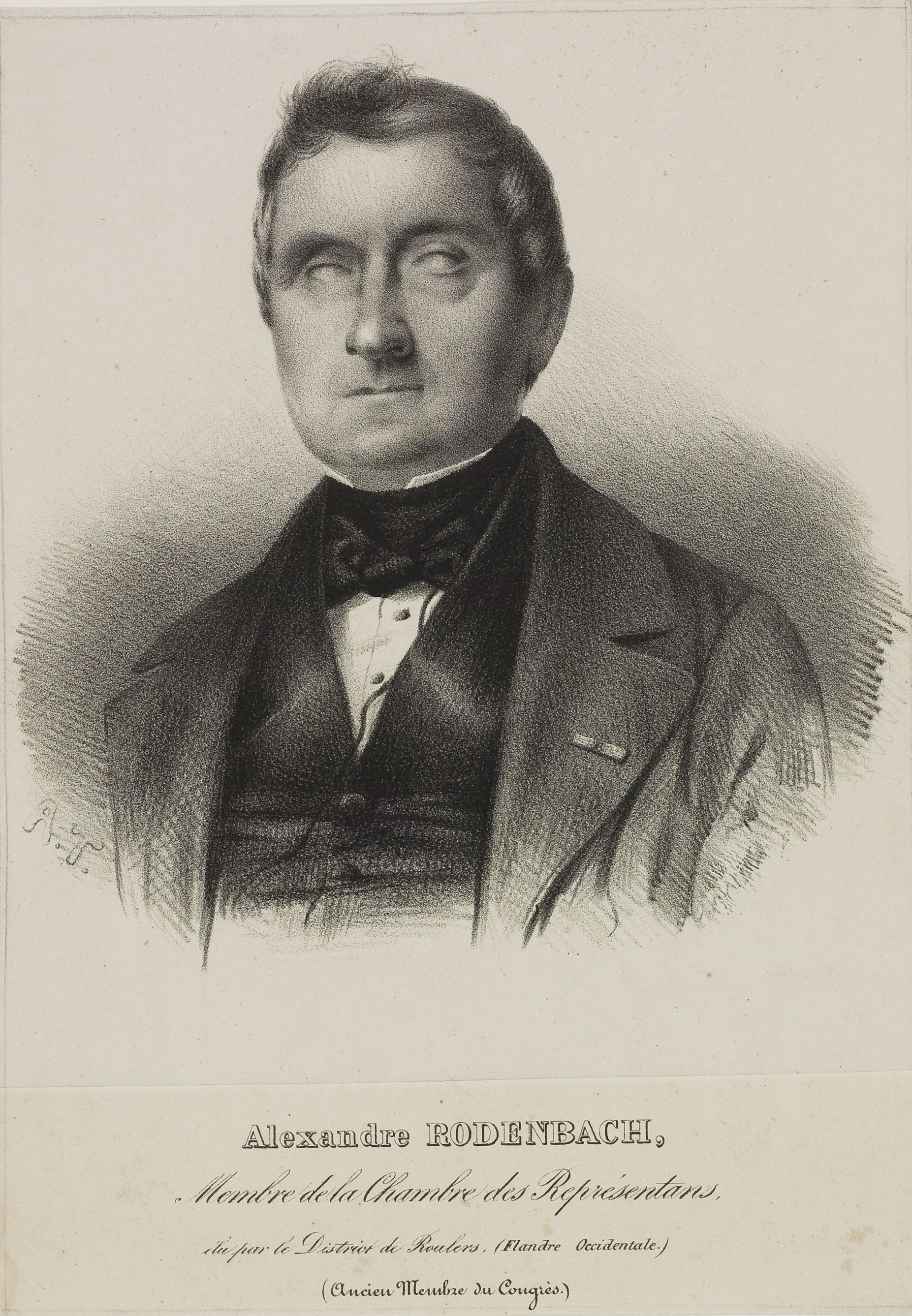
Lithograph portrait of Alexandre Rodenbach (undated)

Alexandre Rodenbach (1786–1869) was a Belgian politician, writer and philanthropist, who was blind from the age of 11.

== Life ==
Rodenbach was born in Roeselaere, in the County of Flanders, on 28 September 1786, to a family originally from the Grand Duchy of Hesse. He was the second son of Jean Rodenbach. His brothers were Ferdinand, Constantin and Pierre. At the age of 11 he lost his sight, and after four failed operations attempting to restore it, he was sent to Valentin Haüy's Musée des Aveugles in Paris, where he became a model student.

In 1807, when King Louis of Holland asked for somebody to replicate this model of education for the blind in Amsterdam, Haüy sent him Rodenbach. Around 1810, Rodenbach returned to his native town to work in his parents' business.

=== Political career ===
Alexandre and Constantin Rodendach were early contributors to the campaigning Ghent newspaper Le Catholique des Pays-Bas, founded in 1826, and supported petitions against the policies of William I's government. At the outbreak of the Belgian Revolution in the summer of 1830, their brother Pierre went to Brussels to organise a body of volunteers, while Alexandre joined with Adolphe Bartels to agitate for the revolution in Bruges.

In November 1830, Alexandre and Constantin were both elected to the National Congress, in which Alexandre supported Constantin's proposal to expel the Nassaus from Belgium. Initially, both brothers voted in favour of offering the Belgian throne to Auguste, Duke of Leuchtenberg; later, Constantin supported offering it to Leopold of Saxe-Coburg, but Alexandre voted against. The brothers also disagreed about compromising on the Treaty of the Eighteen Articles, with Alexandre signing a protest against it on 29 June 1831.

In the 1831 Belgian general election, Alexandre was elected to the Chamber of Representatives for the Roeselare constituency, which he would continue to represent until May 1866. As a parliamentarian he promoted the funding of education for the blind and the deaf, and for the support of those living in poverty. He also pushed for the abolition of stamp duty on newspapers, and a reduction in postal charges.

After the State University of Leuven was shuttered in 1835, it was Alexandre who negotiated the transfer of the recently founded Catholic University from Mechelen to Leuven. At a local level, he was active in organising relief efforts in Rumbeke during the potato blight and typhus epidemic of 1846–1847.

=== Later years ===
Alexandre's brothers died in the course of the 1840s: Ferdinand (born 1773) in 1841, Constantin in 1846, Pierre in 1848.

The publication in 1853 of his book on the history and education of the blind and the deaf, Les aveugles et les sourds-muets, gave him a European reputation. His old school in Paris, renamed Institut impérial des Jeunes Aveugles, organised a festival in his honour in October 1855, and on 10 August 1861 he formally represented Belgium at the unveiling of a statue of Haüy in Paris.

In 1858, he briefly became embroiled in the controversy that ensued upon Charles Carton accusing Joseph Cappron of having plagiarised Joseph-Marie de Gérando's Mémoires sur l'instruction des sourds-muets (Paris, 1827) in his Dutch-language Algemeene opvoedingsleer voor doofstommen (Antwerp, 1857).

Rodenbach died in Rumbeke on 17 August 1869.

== Honours ==
- Officer in the Order of Leopold, 1854
- Order of Saint Michael, 1854
- Order of the Dannebrog, 1854
- Order of Vasa, 1854
- Order of Christ, 1854
- Order of the Rose, 1854
- Order of Charles III, 1855
- Order of St. Gregory the Great, 1855
- Order of the Medjidie, 1856
- Order of St Maurice, 1856
- Order of St George, 1856
- Order of the Redeemer, 1856
- Order of Francis I, 1856
- Cross of the Légion d'honneur, 1856

== Writings ==
- Lettre sur les aveugles (1828)
- Coup d'oeil d'un aveugle sur les sourds-muets (1829)
- Les aveugles et les sourds-muets: histoire, instruction, éducation, biographies (1853)
- Aide-Mémoire de l'aveugle de Roulers (1870)
