= Luingne =

Village in Belgium

Coordinates: 50°44′N 3°14′E

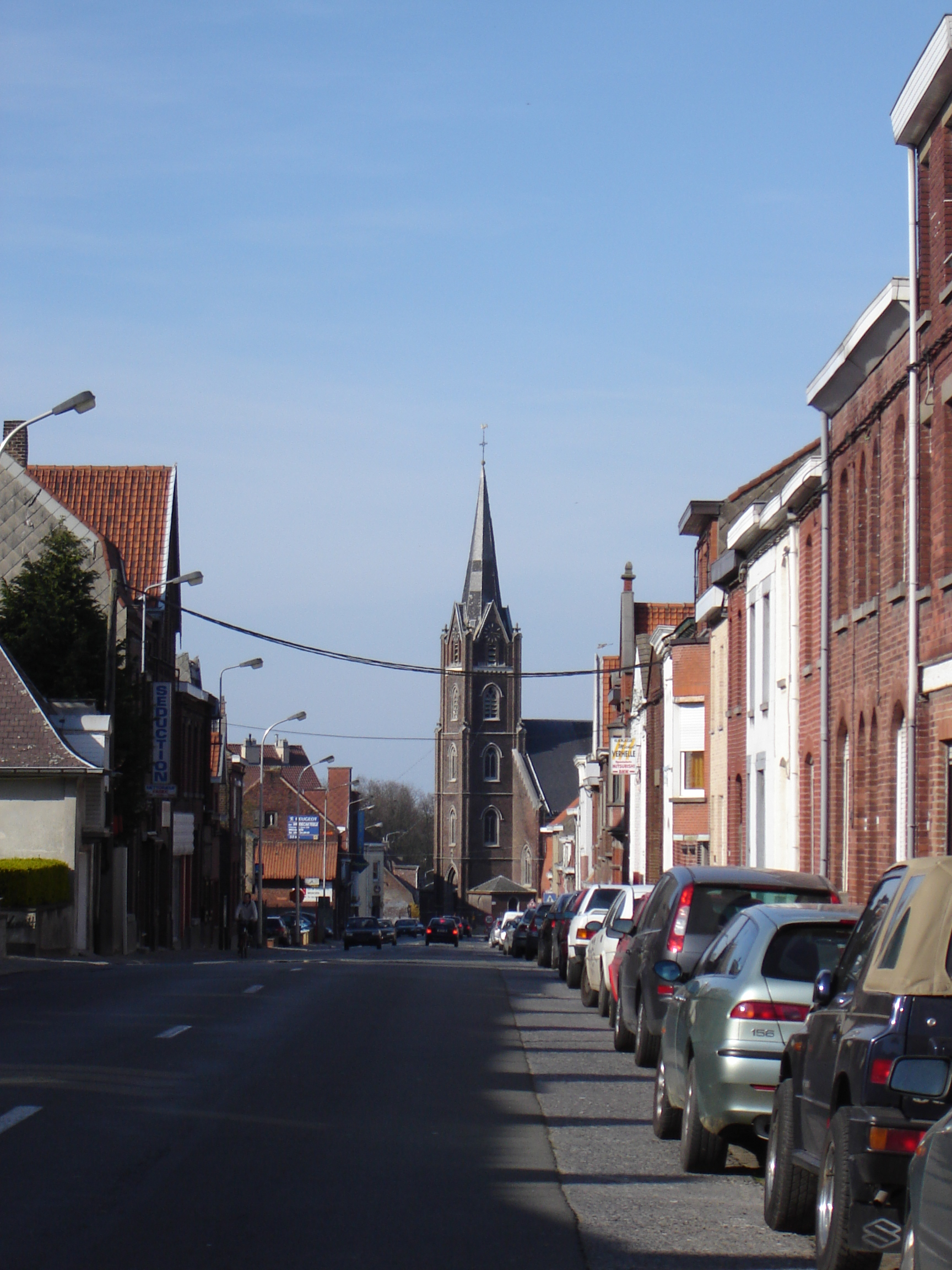
A street in Luingne

Luingne (/lwin/ LWEEN; French pronunciation: [lwin] or [lɥiɲ]; Dutch: Lowingen; Picard: Loinne) is a village of Wallonia and a district of the municipality of Mouscron, located in the province of Hainaut, Belgium.

It was a municipality in its own right before the 1977 fusion of municipalities. The inhabitants are called "Cleugnottes".

The district is 554-acre large.

== Dioceses ==
In 1117, a charter was signed by Ernulfus de Luina. Pope Pascal II (1090-1118) mentions Luingne's altar in a papal bull. A bull of Clement III (1187-1191) confirmed that the chapel and its grounds had been given to the chapter of Tournai. In 1146 the diocese of Tournai was separated from the diocese of Noyon and the presbytery of Luingne became part of the deanery of Helchin. In 1569 the bishop divided this deanery into Helchin-Flamand and Helchin-Wallon, of which Luingne is a part. In 1801, Napoleon created the diocese of Ghent and Luingne (like Mouscron and Herseaux) became part of the deanery of Menin. In 1932, Monsignor Lamiroy, bishop of Bruges, created a French-speaking deanery within his Flemish diocese, grouping together Mouscron-Comines and the surroundings. In 1967, this deanery was attached to the diocese of Tournai under Monsignor Himmer.

== Religious monuments ==
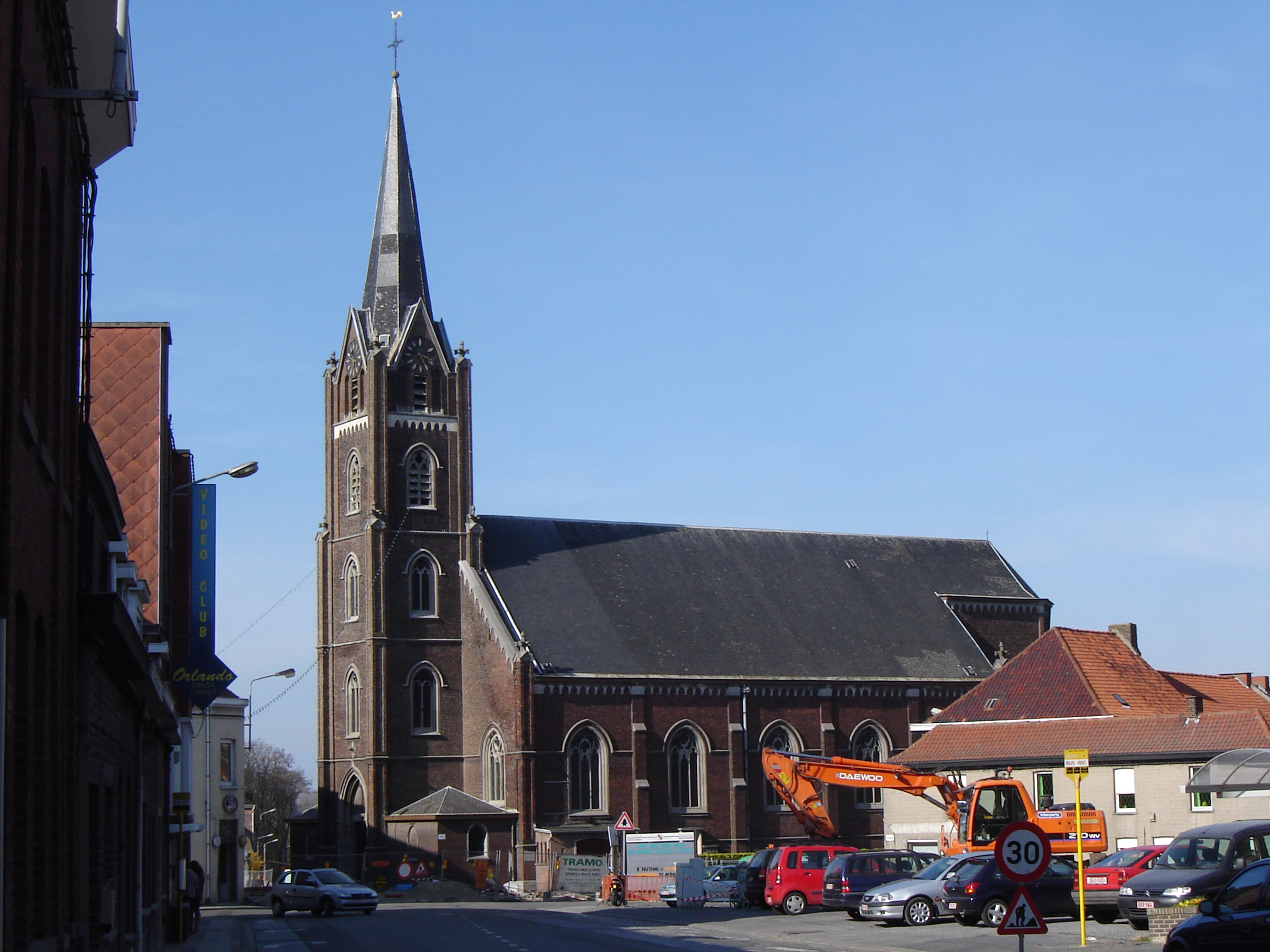
Church of Saint-Amand.

The church has always been in the same place throughout the years. It is even possible that a romanesque building was there before; a drawing from 1813 by Séraphin Vermote represents it. A condemnation for iconoclast destructions committed in the church of Luingne on 24 August 1566 is known thanks to a judgement in Courtrai. The wars of Louis XIV would not spare it either and in 1676 a request was presented in order to repair it. During the French Revolution in 1794, a budget was drawn up to replace the goods that had been pillaged by the sans-culottes. The decision to demolish the old church was made between 1848 and 1850 due to its instability and its small size. A new church, in a neo-Gothic style, named Saint-Amand replaced it at a cost of 40,129 Belgian francs. The building is 20 metres long, 18 metres wide and 15 metres tall. The clock-tower is 42.80 metres high.

== Sources ==
- "Le cleugnottte", a periodic bulletin of the village of Luingne
