= Franz Vansteenkiste =

Belgian politician (1935–2021)

Member of the Chamber of Representatives of Belgium
- In office 1981–1987
- Constituency: Arrondissement of Kortrijk

Schepen of Heule
- In office 1971–1976

Personal details
- Born: 25 February 1935 Kortrijk, Belgium
- Died: 3 May 2021 (aged 86)
- Party: N-VA; VU

Franz Vansteenkiste (25 February 1935 – 3 May 2021) was a Belgian politician and lawyer.

== Biography ==
As a student, Vansteenkiste was a member of the Catholic Flemish Students Union. He earned a doctorate in law from KU Leuven and established himself as a lawyer in Kortrijk. He was affiliate with the Kortrijk Bar from 24 January 1963 to 1 April 2013.

Vansteenkiste was first a member of the People's Union and served as its chairperson in Heule. He was elected as a municipal councilor in 1964 and became Schepen, serving from 1971 to 1976. He then served as a municipal councilor in Kortrijk from 1977 to 1988. He was a Provincial Councilor for West Flanders from 1978 to 1981.

In 1981, Vansteenkiste was elected to the Chamber of Representatives for the Arrondissement of Kortrijk, serving until 1987. During this same time period, he served in the Flemish Council, which later became the Flemish Parliament. In 2012, he ran unsuccessfully for the Municipal Council of Kortrijk as a member of the New Flemish Alliance.

Franz Vansteenkiste died on 3 May 2021 at the age of 86.
