= Charles Faider =

Belgian jurist and politician

Charles Jean Baptiste Florian Faider (6 September 1811 in Trieste – 6 April 1893 in Brussels) was a Belgian jurist and politician.

== Early life ==
Faider was born in Trieste where his father was a high-ranking official of the French Empire for Illyria. After 1814, the family returned to the future Belgium.

== Education and career ==
After studies and a doctorate in Liège and Leuven, Faider practiced law as an advocate before joining the Belgian civil service. He was appointed assistant prosecutor in Leuven 1837, head prosecutor in Antwerp 1842 and solicitor general in Brussels 1844. From 1852 to 1855 he served as minister of Justice under Henri de Brouckère and continued to serve as solicitor general thereafter.

Faider authored a remarkable number of publications in a great variety of legal fields of study. He was a permanent contributor to five legal journals. His most lasting contribution to Belgian law, however, are the briefs he submitted to the Cour de Cassation. Demanding that "verdicts must conform to positive law as well as the necessities created by the changes in society", he helped Belgian courts establish a judicial tradition independent from that of France.
