= Robert Devos =

Belgian politician (1916–1996)

Mayor of Mouscron
- In office 1959–1980
- Preceded by: Joseph Vandevelde
- Succeeded by: Jean-Pierre Detremmerie

Member of Parliament for Kortrijk
- In office June 1958 – 1965

Member of Parliament for Doornik-Aat-Moeskroen
- In office 1965 – February 1981
- Succeeded by: Jean-Pierre Detremmerie

Parliamentary Quaestor
- In office 1968–1971

Member of the Cultural Council for the French Cultural Community
- In office 1971–1981

Member of the Walloon Regional Council
- In office 1980–1981

Personal details
- Born: November 18, 1916 Oostrozebeke, Belgium
- Died: September 3, 1996 (aged 79)
- Party: CVP / PSC
- Occupation: Politician, teacher

Robert Devos (18 November 1916 - 3 September 1996) was a Belgian politician (CVP & PSC). He served as a Member of Parliament ("Volksvertegenwoordiger" / "Député"), representing the Kortrijk electoral district between 1958 and 1965 and the Doornik-Aat-Moeskroen electoral district between 1965 and 1977. He continued to serve as parliamentary Quaestor between 1968 and 1971. He served, more briefly, as a member of the Parliament of Wallonia and the Parliament of the French Community during 1980/81.

Devos was concurrently a member of the district council for the bilingual municipality of Mouscron between 1952 and 1981; between 1959 and 1980 he served as district mayor.

== Life and career ==
=== Provenance and early years ===
Robert Maurice Georges Devos was born during the First World War at Oostrozebeke, a small town then at the heart of the flax industry, and a short distance to the north of Kortrijk in West Flanders. He had been born into a Roman Catholic family, and in 1937/38 he was appointed to a teaching job at the St Joseph Episcopal College, a secondary school in Mouscron, some 20 miles to the south of his birth-town. At some stage he acquired a teaching degree from the "Hoger instituut voor pedagogie" (as the teaching academy at Ghent was then known) in East Flanders. Mouscron, where he taught at the Francophone college till 1945, is known for its sixteenth century "Hurlus" protestant rebels. During the public career of Robert Devos in the second half of the twentieth century, the town's cultural-religious and linguistic differences would continue to provide a challenging backdrop for politics in the region that still finds itself at the western end of Belgium's Franco-Flemish language frontier. During the 1940s he engaged actively with the "Christelijke Ziekenkassen" (Christian health insurance movement) and in 1945 became deputy chairman of the "Christelijke Mutualiteiten" (nationwide federation of Christian health insurance organisations).

=== Municipal politician ===
At the local elections held in October 1952, Robert Devos stood successfully as a PSC list candidate for election to the Mouscron municipal council. He would continue as a member of the council without a break till 1981. In 1957 the PSC won an overall majority on the council and Devos became deputy mayor. At the start of 1959 he became Mayor of Mouscron in succession to Joseph Vandevelde of the Belgian Socialist Party.

=== National politician ===
By 1958 the PSC had been subsumed into the centre-right "Christelijke Volkspartij" / "Parti Social Chrétien" ("Christian Social Party" / CVP). It was as a CVP candidate that Devos stood in the June 1958 general election: The CVP won the election nationally despite falling very slightly short of obtaining an overall majority of votes and seats in the parliament ("Kamer van Volksvertegenwoordigers" / "Chambre des représentants"). Four of the six members representing the Kortrijk electoral district came from the CVP. Robert Devos was one of them. Major constitutional changes were implemented in 1965, triggering major boundary changes to electoral districts. Devos now sat as one of seven constituency members representing the Doornik-Aat-Moeskroen electoral district till resigning his seat in 1981. In the parliament Devos served between 1968 and 1971 as Quaestor / Questeur, an administrative function involving the scheduling and organisation of parliamentary business.

The constitutional reforms implemented in December 1970 provided for the creation of a "Cultural Council for the French Cultural Community ("Cultuurraad voor de Franse Cultuurgemeenschap" / "Conseil culturel de la Communauté française"), which exercised certain responsibilities and powers in the fields of language, arts and education, in that part of Belgium classified as primarily French-speaking. The Cultural Council was not separately elected. Instead, a "double mandate" system, provided for members of the national parliament representing the affected region to be included also as members of the Cultural Council. Robert Devos therefore sat as a member of the "Cultural Council for the French Cultural Community between 1971 and 1981. Similar arrangements were made in 1980 for the new Walloon Regional Council (precursor of the separately elected Walloon Parliament, launched in 1995). Accordingly, during 1980/81 Devos also sat as a member of the Walloon Regional Council. In February 1981 Robert Devos resigned his various parliamentary mandates, to be succeeded by Jean-Pierre Detremmerie, who shortly before had already taken over as Mayor of Mouscron.

=== Transfer of Mouscron ===
Although citizens with French as their first language outnumbered people with Flemish as a first language by approximately 3:1 in Mouscron through the first half of the twentieth century, it remained in the Belgian province of West Flanders, in which Flemish predominates as the mother tongue of the majority. A law passed in 1962 sought to remove the long-standing inequities of class, wealth and status between French speakers and Flemish speakers which had been entrenched in the country since long before 1830. Separate language areas were established for each of the three linguistically defined communities. Each province was defined as either Flemish-speaking or else French-speaking. Special arrangements were made for the German-speaking communities in the east of Belgium, which were given a fair measure of autonomy, albeit still within the otherwise French-speaking Wallonia area. Special arrangements were also made for the Brussels region, to take account of the stark linguistic differences between adjacent and closely connected quarters of the city. But little Mouscron lacked the political muscle of Brussels or even of the German speaking eastern cantons. It was instead simply transferred from Flemish-speaking West Flanders to French-speaking Hainaut, in a move which Robert Devos, as municipal mayor, bitterly opposed, with the backing of many of his Mouscron fellow-citizens.
