= André Bourgeois =

Belgian politician (1928–2015)

André Bourgeois (French pronunciation: [ɑ̃dʁe buʁʒwa]; 4 March 1928 – 18 October 2015) was a Belgian politician who was the Minister of Agriculture between 1992 and 1995. He had previously served as the mayor of Izegem from 1965 to 1970.

== Honours ==
- 12 February 1996: Grand officer of the Order of Orange-Nassau.
- 14 November 1991: Commander of the Order of Leopold.
- 8 July 1969: Knight of the Order of the Crown.
- 9 June 1999 : Knight Grand Cross of the Order of Leopold II.
