= Alfred Gadenne =

Belgian politician (1946–2017)

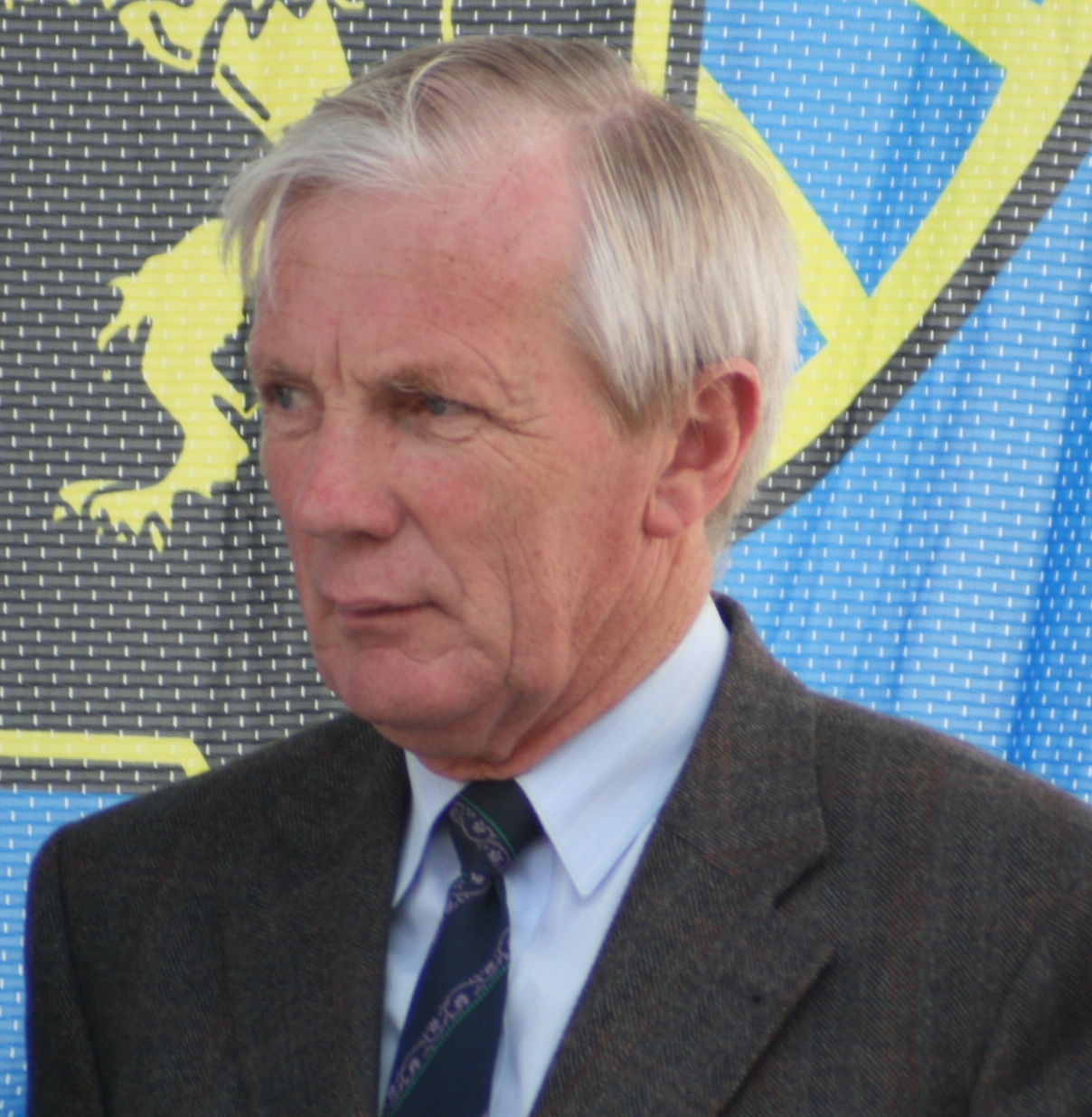
- Gadenne in 2008

Mayor of Mouscron

Personal details
- Born: 31 January 1946
- Died: 11 September 2017 (aged 71) Mouscron, Hainaut, Belgium
- Cause of death: Murder
- Occupation: Politician

Alfred Gadenne (31 January 1946 – 11 September 2017) was a Belgian politician for the Centre démocrate humaniste and mayor of Mouscron in Hainaut until his death in September 2017.

== Death ==
Gadenne was murdered on 11 September 2017 at the age of 71. He was killed at a municipal graveyard close to his home in Mouscron by Nathan Duponcheel. Local news outlets at first reported that a suspect handed himself in to police and that the motive was unclear. The next day the then 18-year-old man told police he killed Gadenne to avenge the death of his father, who committed suicide in 2015 after losing his job as a local council employee.
