= Tony Van Parys =

Belgian politician (born 1951)

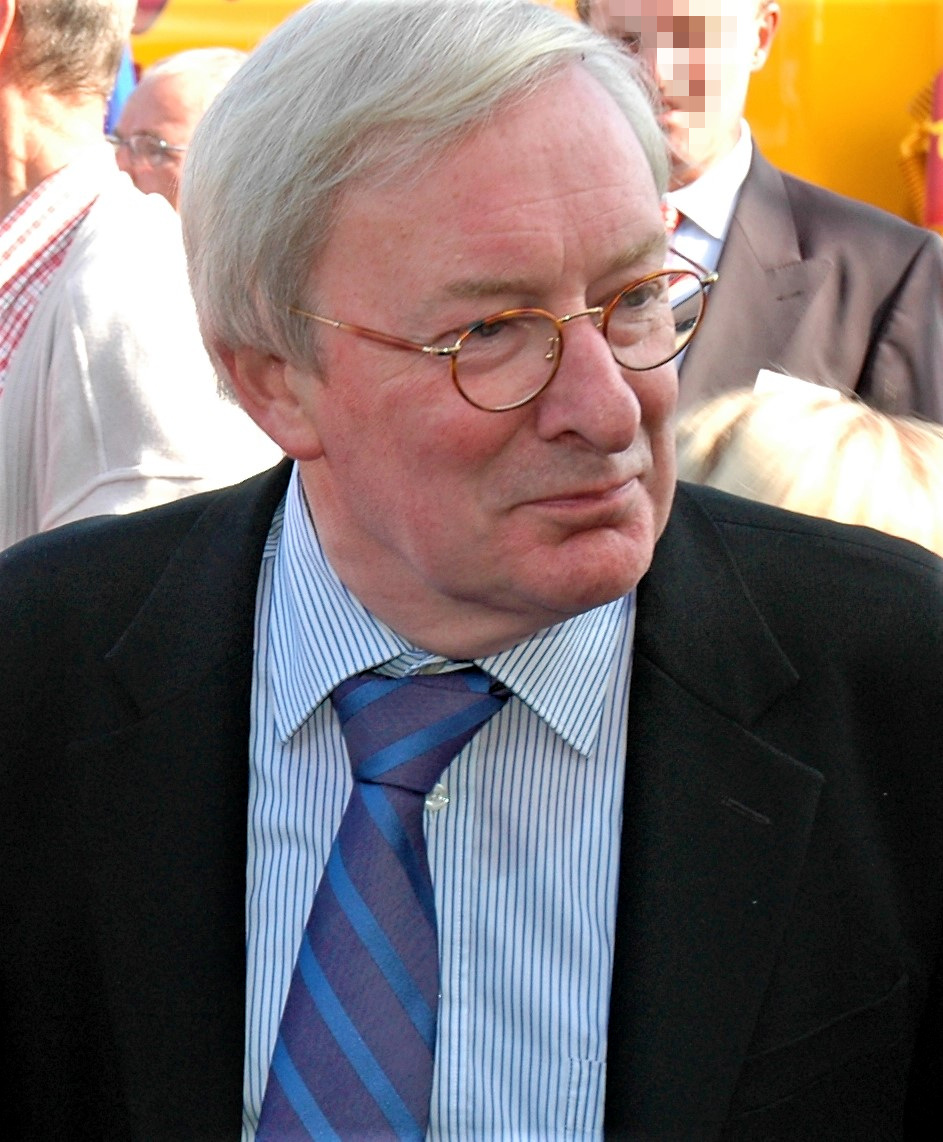
- Tony Van Parys visits Werktuigdagen Oudenaard in 2007

Senator
- In office 28 June 2007 – June 2010

Personal details
- Born: 21 June 1951 (age 74) Ghent
- Party: Christen-Democratisch en Vlaams

Tony J.M.M. Van Parys (born 21 June 1951) is a Belgian CD&V politician.

Van Parys was first chosen to the Belgian Chamber of Representatives in 1985, on a CVP ticket. He was chiefly Minister of Justice in the second Dehaene government (1998-1999).

Van Parys was part of the 1988 parliamentary commission looking into the "ways that banditry and terrorism suppression are organized [in Belgium]." Together with Philippe Laurent of the Parti social chrétien he wrote the main report that detailed the results.

He was elected as a member of the Belgian Senate in 2007. Van Parys succeeded Erik De Lembre as chairman of the board of directors of Ghent's Arteveldehogeschool in October 2011.

== Notes ==
Preceded by Stefaan De Clerck	Belgian Minister of Justice; 24 April 1998–12 July 1999	Succeeded by Marc Verwilghen
