= Alfred De Taeye =

Belgian politician (1905–1958)

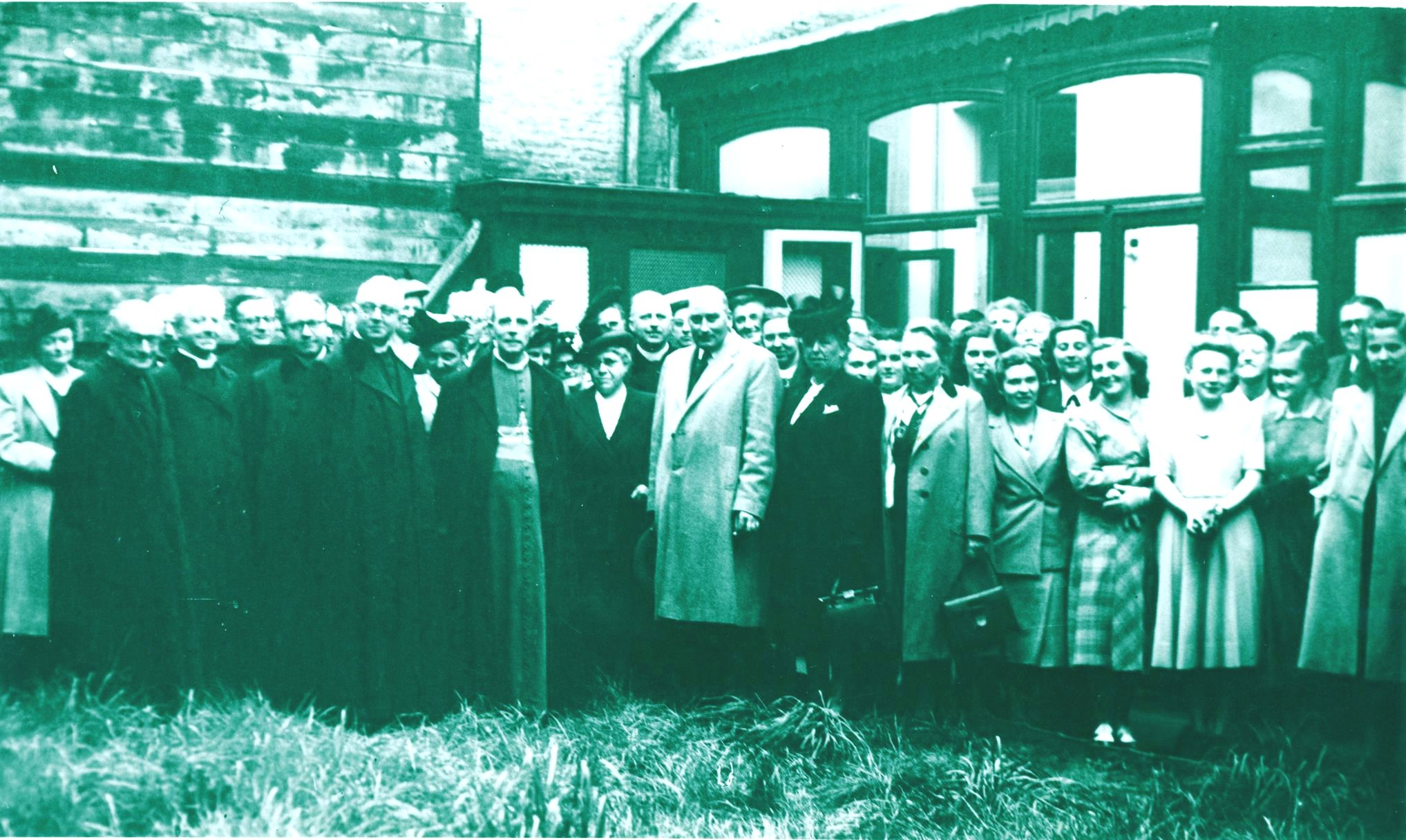
- De Taeye (centre) at the opening of the Institute for Psychosocial Training in Kortrijk (September 1948)

Member of the Chamber of Representatives
- In office 17 February 1946 – 11 April 1958
- Constituency: Kortrijk

Minister of Health and Families
- In office 8 June 1950 – 23 April 1954

Personal details
- Born: 21 June 1905 Kaprijke, East Flanders, Belgium
- Died: 11 April 1958 (aged 52) Leuven, Brabant, Belgium
- Party: Christian Social Party

Alfred Aloïs De Taeye (1905–1958) was a Belgian Christian Democrat trade unionist and politician.

== Career ==
De Taeye was active in the Confederation of Christian Trade Unions in Kortrijk and sat on the city council from 1938 to 1942. From 1948 to 1950 he was mayor of Kortrijk. In the 1946 Belgian general election he was elected to the Chamber of Representatives for the Constituency of Kortrijk, remaining in parliament until his death on 11 April 1958. From 1950 to 1954 he served as minister of health and families in the governments headed by Jean Duvieusart, Joseph Pholien, and Jean Van Houtte.

As a parliamentarian he played a key role in post-war housing policy, drafting a law that funded 50,000 social homes and subsidised the building of small family homes (1948), and another that encouraged slum clearance (1953). The first of these laws has been seen as causing a proliferation of ribbon development in postwar Belgium, while the second encouraged insufficiently planned urban redevelopment.

== Publications ==
- "De actuele aspecten van het huisvestingsprobleem in Belgie", Economisch en Sociaal Tijdschrift, 12 (1955), pp. 279–294.
