= Jules Bara =

Belgian statesman and liberal politician

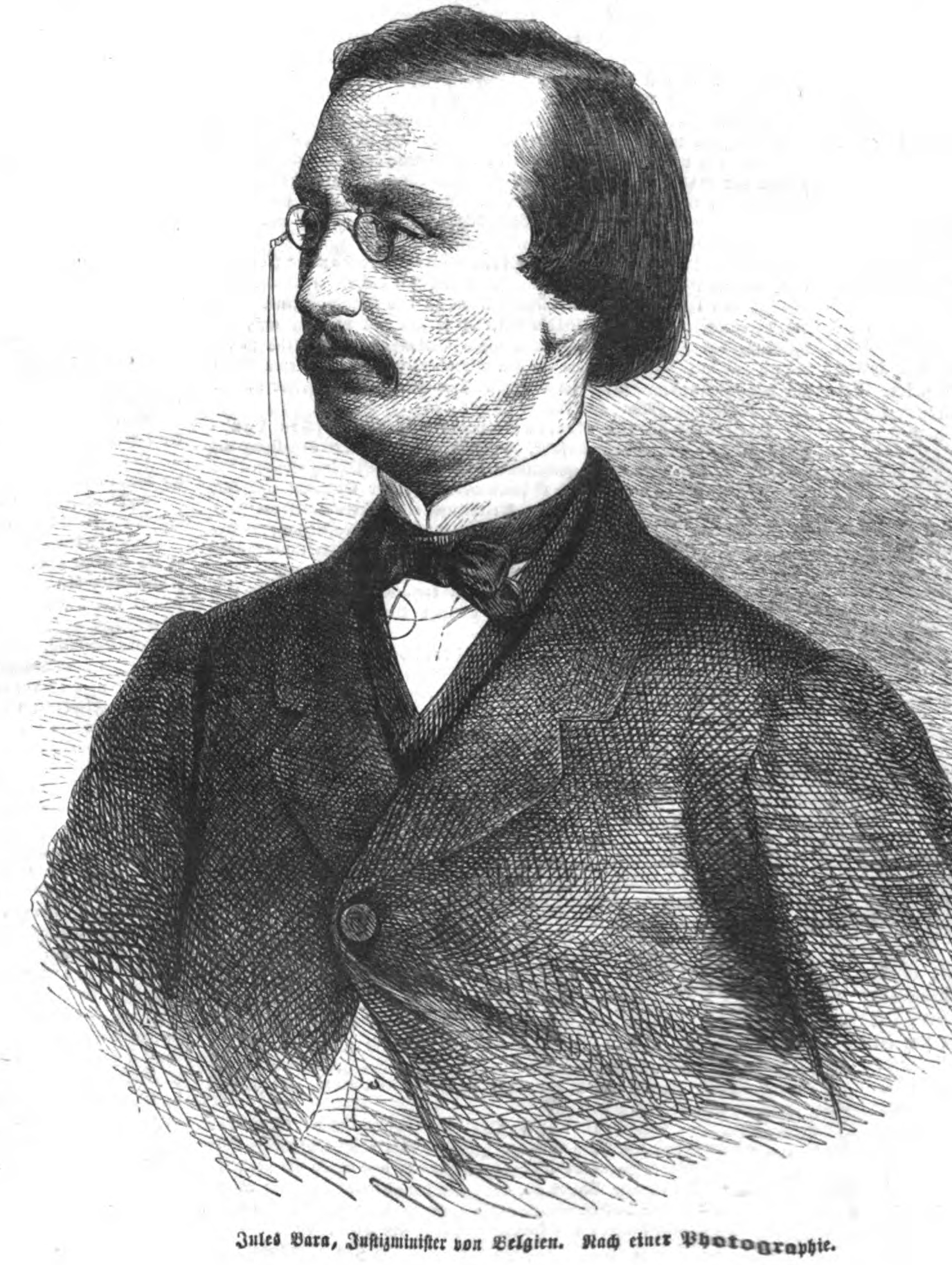
- Jules Bara
- Born: 23 August 1835; Tournai, Belgium
- Died: 26 June 1900 (aged 64); Brussels, Belgium
- Occupations: statesman, politician

Jules Bara (23 August 1835 – 26 June 1900) was a Belgian statesman and liberal politician.

== Early years ==
He was born in Tournai and pursued the study of law in his native town, showing remarkable intellectual gifts and a fine power of oratory.

== Career ==
Shortly after he had begun his professional practice he was summoned to be professor of law at the Université libre de Bruxelles and established his reputation by a treatise on the relations of church and state, the Essai sur les rapports de l'etat et des religions au point de vue constitutionnel (1859). He succeeded Tesch as Minister of Justice in 1865, being appointed to that position by King Leopold II. In line with his extremely Liberal tendencies, he attempted, in 1868, to bring about the abolition of capital punishment, but failed because of a powerful opposition in the Senate. After the failure of the Frère-Orban cabinet in 1870 Bara reëntered the Chamber of Representatives and by his great power of invective caused the resignation of the Clerical Ministry of D'Anethau in 1871 and helped to overthrow the Ministry of Malou in 1878. Bara became once more Minister of Justice under Frère-Orban, resigning in 1884 after the overwhelming defeat of the Liberals at the polls. From 1884 to 1894 he was leader of the Opposition in the Lower Chamber, but in the latter year failed of reëlection, entering the Senate soon afterward.

== Death ==
He died in Brussels, 26 June 1900.

== Mason ==
He was a Freemason, raised in 1859 in the lodge Les Vrais Amis de l'Union et du Progrès from Bruxelles.

== Sources ==
- Liberal Archive
