= André Kempinaire =

Belgian politician

- Born: André Marguerite Guillaume Kempinaire; 26 January 1929; Hasselt, Belgium
- Died: 8 September 2012 (aged 83); Avelgem, Belgium
- Occupation: politician

André Marguerite Guillaume Kempinaire (26 January 1929 – 8 September 2012) was a Belgian liberal politician for the Party for Freedom and Progress (PVV).

Kempinaire is a doctor in Law and a lawyer. He was a member of the Belgian Federal Parliament (1965–1968 and 1971–1991) for the PVV in the district Kortrijk and became State Secretary for public office (1976–1977), minister of the Flemish community (1980), and State Secretary of foreign trade (1981–1985), and of development cooperation (1985–1989).

== Sources ==
- André Kempinaire (Council of Europe)
