= Stefaan De Clerck =

Belgian politician (born 1951)

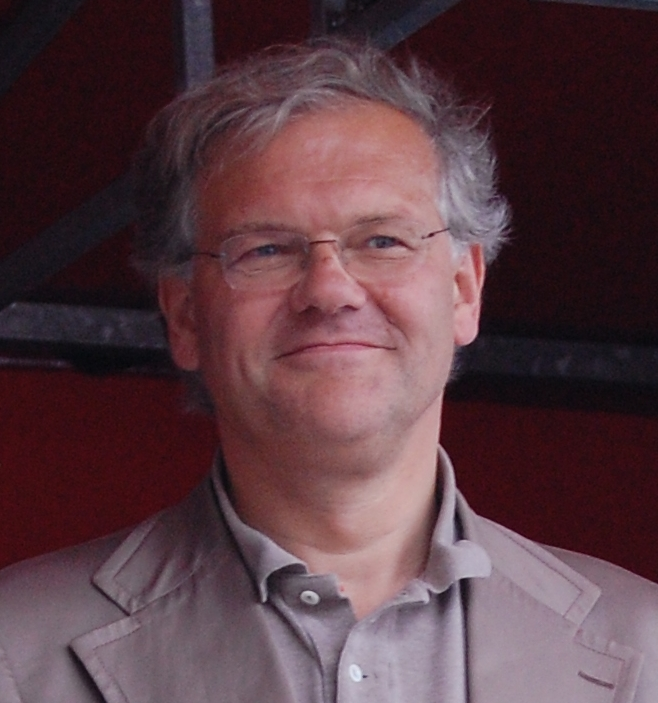

Minister of Justice
- In office 30 December 2008 – 6 December 2011
- Prime Minister: Herman Van Rompuy; Yves Leterme
- Preceded by: Jo Vandeurzen
- Succeeded by: Annemie Turtelboom
- In office 28 June 1995 – 24 April 1998
- Prime Minister: Jean-Luc Dehaene
- Preceded by: Melchior Wathelet
- Succeeded by: Tony Van Parys

Personal details
- Born: 12 December 1951 (age 74)
- Party: Christian Democratic and Flemish

Stefaan Maria Joris Yolanda De Clerck (Dutch pronunciation: [steːˈfaːn də ˈklɛr(ə)k]; born 12 December 1951) is a Belgian politician and former Minister of Justice of Belgium. He was Minister of Justice from 1995 until 1998 as well, when he resigned following the escape from prison of Marc Dutroux. He has served as chairman of Christian Democratic and Flemish party and held a seat in the Belgian Chamber of Representatives. De Clerck was mayor of Kortrijk.

Regarding re-instituting the death penalty in Belgium after the "Joker" murders of 2009, GlobalPost quotes De Clerck as saying: "That is not something for our times. It's not by killing somebody that we solve society's problems, just look at the United States."
