= Eugène Soudan =

Flemish lawyer, jurist and politician

Eugène Edouard César Gaëtan Soudan (4 December 1880 – 30 November 1960) was a lawyer, jurist and politician.

== Biography ==
He was born into a liberal bourgeois family in the city of Ronse.

He did his primary education in his hometown, he then makes his secondary studies at the Royal Grammar School in Tournai and that of Ghent.

At the University of Ghent, then only French-speaking, he obtained a university degree in Philosophy and then continued to obtain a Doctor of Law with great distinction on 9 July 1904.

He began a career as a lawyer in Brussels with in the office of Charles Dejongh, one of the most eminent jurists of the country at the time. In 1917, will be the chief of staff for the cabinet of Emile Vandervelde.

During the first world war, Soudan served as delegate of the interdepartmental commission of supplies. He was Minister of Finance in 1938.

During the second world war, Soudan was arrested in 1943 and detained in several prisons. From January 1944 until the Liberation, he was a prisoner in Buchenwald concentration camp.
