= Mouscron =

City in Hainaut Province, Wallonia, Belgium

Mouscron Moucron (Picard): Moeskroen (Dutch)
- City and municipality
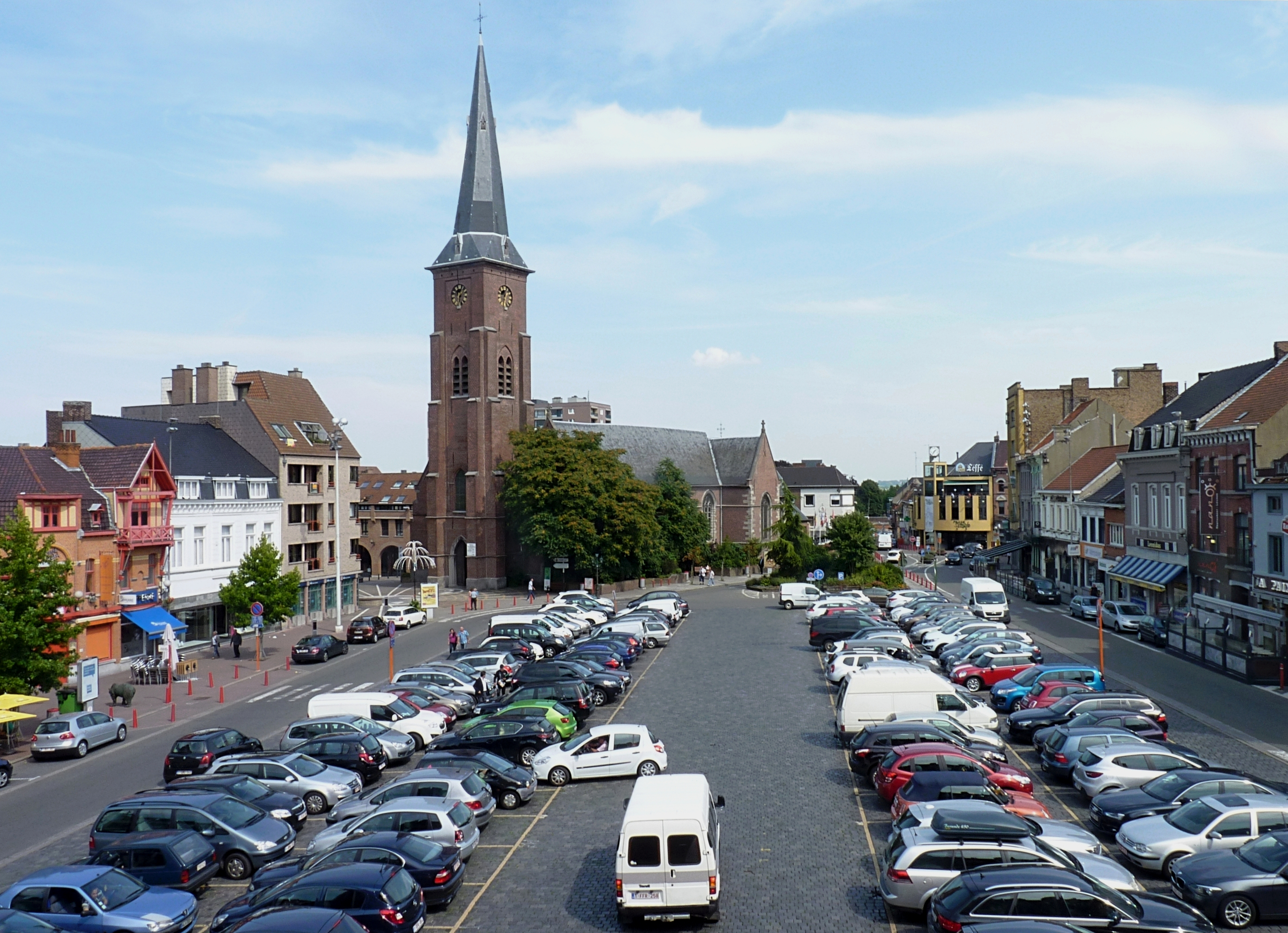

- Flag Coat of arms

- Location of Mouscron in Hainaut
- Interactive map of Mouscron
- Location in Belgium
- Coordinates: 50°44′N 03°13′E
- Country: Belgium
- Community: French Community
- Region: Wallonia
- Province: Hainaut
- Arrondissement: Tournai-Mouscron

Government
  - Mayor: Ann Cloet (Les Engagés)
  - Governing party: Les Engagés-MR

Area
  - Total: 40.62 km^{2} (15.68 sq mi)

Population (2018-01-01)
  - Total: 58,234
  - Density: 1,434/km^{2} (3,713/sq mi)
- Postal codes: 7700, 7711, 7712
- NIS code: 57096
- Area codes: 056
- Website: www.mouscron.be

Mouscron (French pronunciation: [mukʁɔ̃]; Dutch and West Flemish: Moeskroen, Dutch pronunciation: [muˈskrun]; Picard and Walloon: Moucron) is a municipality and city of Wallonia located in the Belgian province of Hainaut, along the border with the French city of Tourcoing, which is part of the Lille metropolitan area.

The municipality consists of the following districts: Dottignies, Herseaux, Luingne, and Mouscron. In accordance with the national law, the municipality offers facilities for the Dutch speaking minority. Kortrijk, in Flanders, is located just to the north of Mouscron.

The city substantially grew during the 19th and early 20th century with the development of the textile industry in the north of France. The symbol of the city is the Hurlu: a character representing Protestant activists, who plundered the countryside during the Wars of Religion (16th century).

== Geography ==
Mouscron is divided into 7 districts: the downtown (le centre), the train station (la gare), Mont-à-Leux, Tuquet, Risquons-Tout, Nouveau-Monde and Coquinie. The municipality of Mouscron now also includes the old municipalities of Dottignies, Luingne, and Herseaux since the Fusion of the Belgian municipalities. The metropolitan area of Mouscron forms a conurbation with the French metropolitan area of Lille and is at the crossroad of three different administrative regions: Wallonia, France and Flanders. Mouscron is located 9 km from Roubaix, 11 km from Kortrijk, 23 km from Lille and 25 km from Tournai. The city has been part of the French-speaking province of Hainaut since 1963 and, as a result, part of the administrative region of Wallonia.

== History ==
=== Middle Ages ===
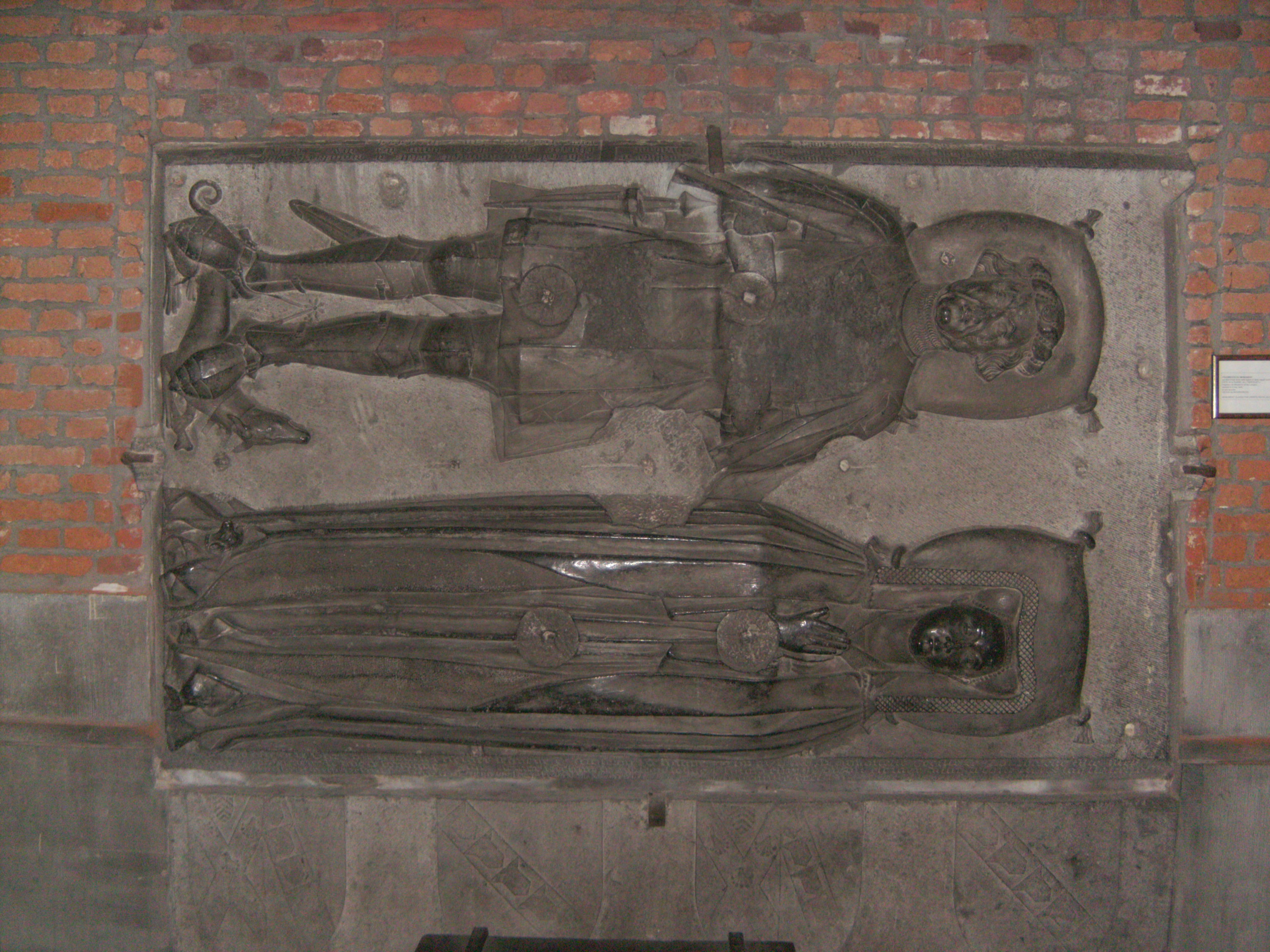
Funerary Monument to Oste de la Barre, Lord of Mouscron (c. 1380–1446) and his second wife, Cécile de Mourkercke (c. 1400–1462) in St. Bartholomew's Church

A few archaeological discoveries were made in this area proving the existence of settlements during Roman times. The name Dottignies – a village that is now part of Mouscron – appeared for the first time in the 9th century, while that of Mouscron only appeared in 1060. In 1066, Baldwin V, Count of Flanders, ceded the local buildings and territories to the estate of the Church of Saint-Pierre in Lille. In 1149, the right to collect tithes in the Mouscron area was ceded in part to the Abbey of Saint Martin in Tournai, in part to the Chapter of the Tournai Cathedral. The rights to the neighbouring villages of Herseaux and Luingne – now also part of Mouscron – were also given to the Tournai Cathedral in 1178. In the 14th century, the Seigneury of Mouscron was eventually sold to a lord of Tournai, and in 1430, the Castle of the Counts (Château des Comtes) became the lord's manor, which can still be seen today. The future Charles V, Holy Roman Emperor, stopped there for dinner on May 27, 1516.

=== 16th–18th centuries ===
In 1575, in the middle of the Wars of Religion, the castle was strengthened. It was nevertheless besieged and taken by the Geuzen, locally known as the Hurlus in 1579, before being taken back three months later. In 1627, Philip IV of Spain promoted the seigneury to the rank of county. The Franco-Dutch War under Louis XIV devastated this mostly agricultural region. Mouscron and the surrounding area became French after the Treaty of Aix-la-Chapelle (1668). Part of it rejoined the Southern Netherlands after the Treaty of Nijmegen (1678), which drew the frontier right through its territory. It was finally completely ceded to the Southern Netherlands under the terms of the Treaty of Utrecht in 1713. The textile industry started in Mouscron in the 1760s thanks to the imposition by Lille of a ban on the fabrication of molletons, a mixture of flax and wool, in Roubaix and Tourcoing. With the Battle of Fleurus (1794), Mouscron went back to France.

=== 19th–20th centuries ===
At the beginning of the 19th century, the textile industry flourished and added cotton as one of its prime materials. On March 29, 1848, the Belgian army intervened near Mouscron against a troop of French republican sympathizers who were ready to invade Belgium, in what was known as the Risquons-Tout incident. By the end of the century, several cotton mills and carpet plants were built, leading the village to expand into a much larger urban area, especially after the close of World War I.

During World War II, from May 22 to 27, 1940, artillery fire brought British and German soldiers into conflict in the Risquons-Tout district. 15 British soldiers, 10 German soldiers and 5 civilians were killed in the incident.

In 1963, Mouscron was transferred from the province of West Flanders, to the province of Hainaut, to reflect the predominantly francophone population (94% in 1846 and 74% in 1947). Mouscron was officially recognized as a city in 1986.

== Sights ==
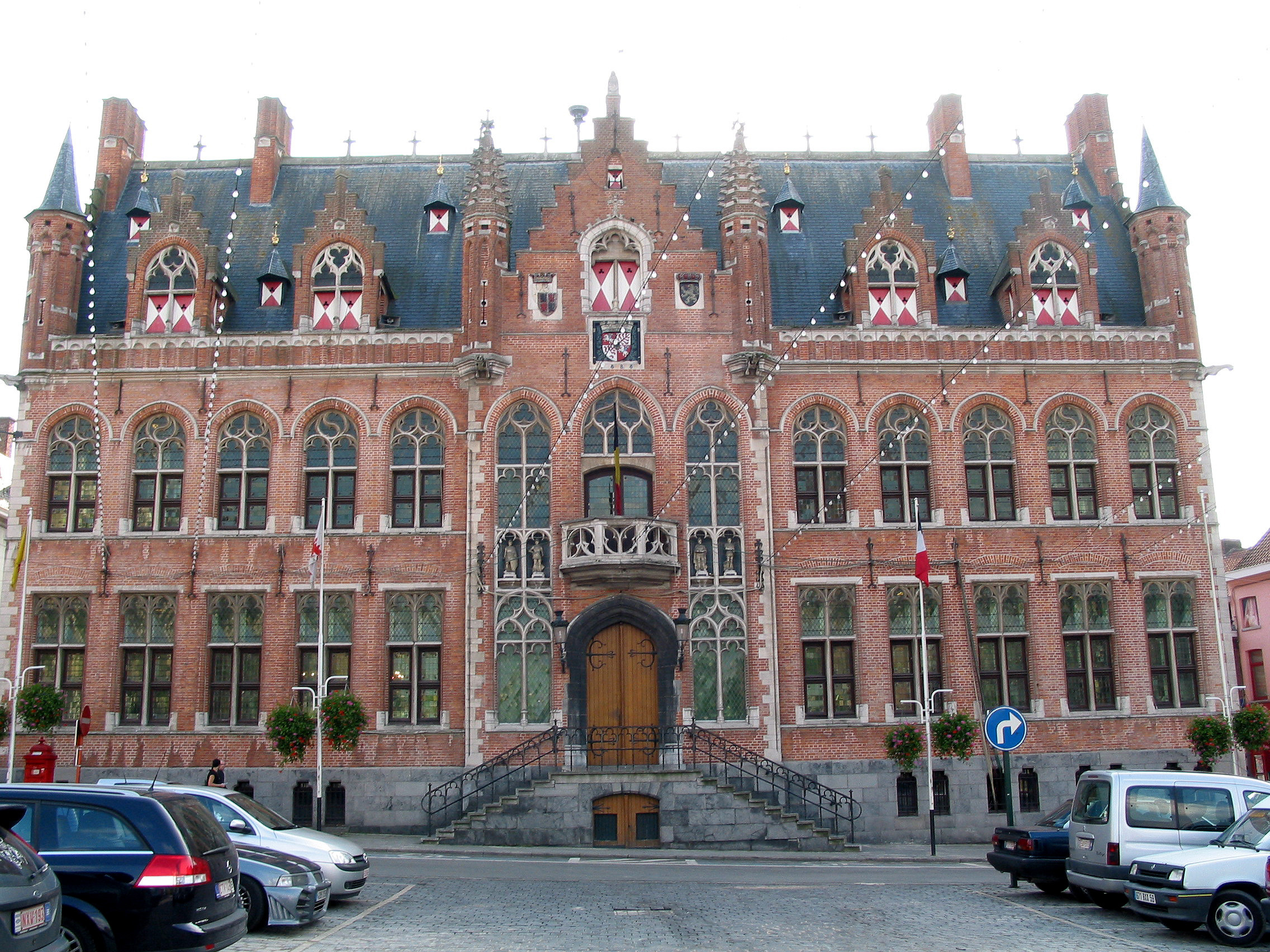
Mouscron town hall

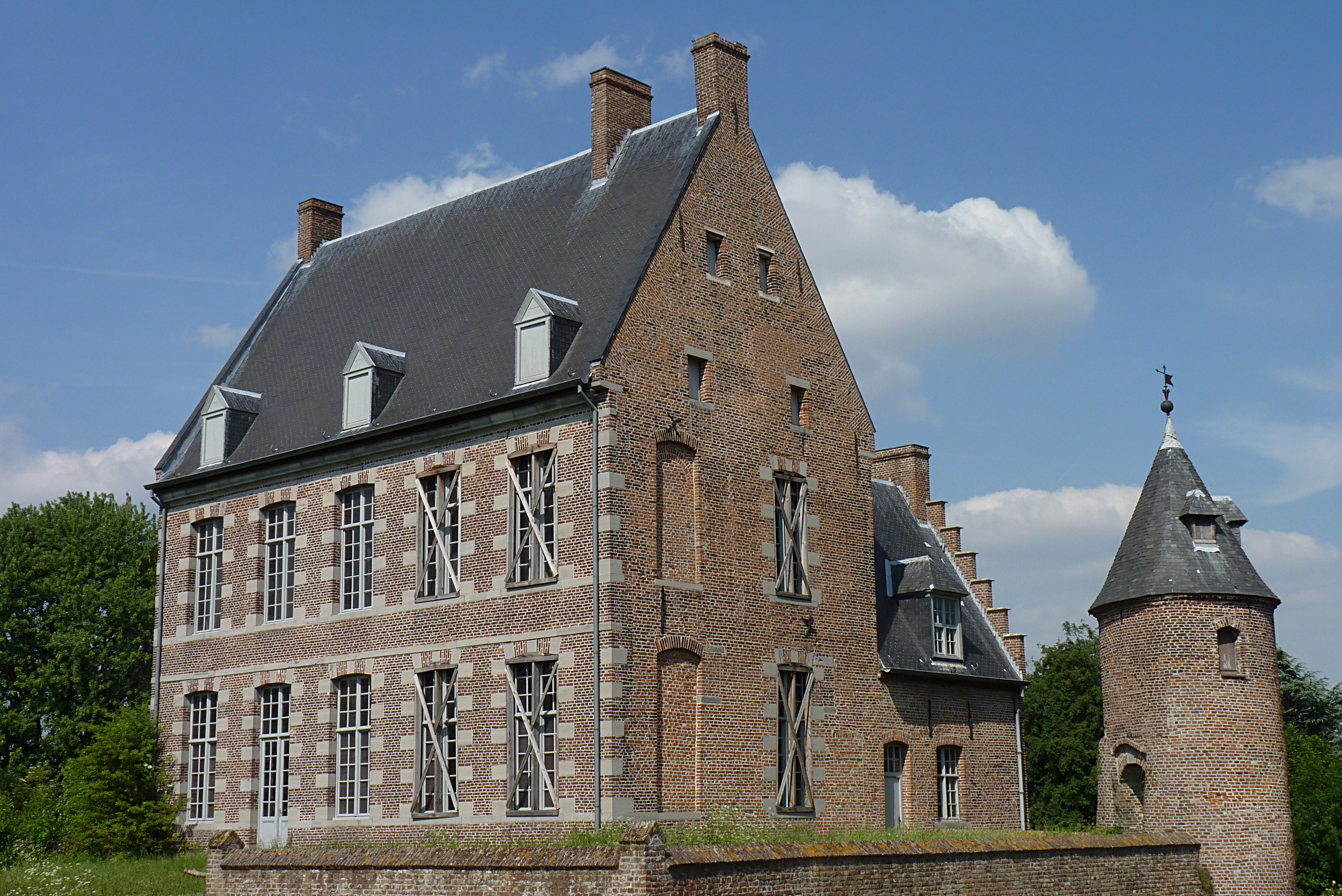
Château des Comtes

- The town hall and the main square (Grand Place). The town hall was opened in 1890. It was designed by the architect René Aimé Buyck from Bruges and the style may be defined as neo gothic from maritime Flanders. The building is outstanding because of the harmony of its proportions and the fineness of its sculptures.
- St. Bartholomew's Church
- The medieval castle known as the Château des Comtes can still be visited. The oldest extant parts date from the 15th century. Four families of lords lived in it during six centuries. From this big domain remains its courtyard marked by annexes from 16th to 17th centuries and moats.
- Mouscron's public park dates back to the 1930s. With its ponds and manicured green areas, it is home to all the plant varieties that can be grown in the local climate and it extends over an area of 7 hectares. It was inaugurated in 1932 by Fernand Cocq.
- The house of Picardy (Maison Picarde). The building was built around 1922. The inside is worth visiting. The painted earthenware that adorns the main hall of the second story were classified as historical artifacts. They depict bucolic scenes which praise the values of socialism, work, empowerment, knowledge and family. They were made by the studio of Jules Biesbroek.
- The Urban Renewal (La Rénovation urbaine). At the beginning of 1980s, a big revitalization project was decided. The old Green Square was transformed and renamed Emmanuel de Neckere Square. The paving is worth looking at in more detail as it depicts the city's motto: "Loyal to the King, up to carrying the beggar's pouch" (French: "Fidèle au roy, jusqu'à porter la besace"). At the center of this modern atrium, you can see the fountain made by Bernard Verhaeghe, a local artist, in 1987.
- The olympic-size swimming pool (Les dauphins);
- The cultural center (Marius Staquet); has 3 main facilities: the Raymond Devos theater, the André Demeyère auditorium and the Jacques Brel exhibition hall
- The exhibition hall (Centr'expo); hosts exhibitions, fairs and events
- The Art Gallery; set up in the old swimming pool
- The stadium (Cannonier); can hold 10,830 spectators
- The public library
- The El bar café; hosts concerts
- Studio RQC (Radio qui chifel); the independent radio station of the city

== Festivities ==
- The Hurlus Festival (Fête des Hurlus): The Hurlus Festival happens every first weekend of October. On Friday evening, children from across the city gather on the main square for the lantern procession. Children are accompanied by fanfare, musicians and other traditional groups. They walk around the city and sing the main couplet of the traditional song. On Saturday, the inhabitants walk around the downtown to see traditional groups, majorettes, itinerant traders, musicians and craftsmen and a big bowls competition is organized. Then, the historical procession starts in the streets of the city. It is based on two main legendary events: the kidnapping of the Spanish-allied Adins vicar by the Hurlus and the fight in five trials between the Spanish leader (Don Ferrante de la Plancha y otros barrios) and the leader of the Hurlus. If the Hurlu leader wins the reenactment, little Hurlus dolls will be tossed into the crowd. Celebrations are in full swing to the beat of drums and trumpets until Sunday when Hurlus dolls are tossed from a raised platform on the main square.
- The Hand Festival (French: Fête de la Main) in Dottignies. Every third week-end of September, a company of Gilles roams the streets of the village and distributes the traditional oranges to passers-by. The festival takes its name from the copper hand, possibly a symbol of fraternity, which tops the steeple of the church of Dottignies.
- A Christmas Market takes place every year on the main square.
- The vingt-quatre heure de Mouscron takes place every September. The ultimate goal of the event is to raise money for charity. The event includes groups of sportsmen running around the city for 24 hours.

== The musical period ==
From 1960 to 1980, the city experienced a vibrant period in the music industry.

The studio of Marcel De Keukeleire and Jean Van Loo produced famous European artists like Chocolat's (Brasilia Carnaval), Patrick Hernandez (Born to Be Alive), Amadeo (Moving Like A Superstar), J.J. Lionel (Chicken dance) and the Crazy Horse band, which was partly made up of people from Mouscron.

In 1967, Jimi Hendrix gave his only Belgian concert at the Twenty club. Other artists of the 1960s to have performed in the club include: The Animals, The Small Faces, The Kinks, The Yardbirds, Gene Vincent, The Moody Blues. The latter stayed in Mouscron for the writing of their album "Days of Future Passed". In 1978, their Song "Top rank suite" alludes to the city's name with the sentence: "They played a good game of football in Mucron". The Moody Blues were certainly fans of football but they blatantly forgot how to spell the city's name.

Eventually, the beginning of the song "Les Bourgeois" of Jacques Brel, anecdotally mentions the name of "Adrienne du Mont-à-Leux", who was the owner of a café in the city.

== Demographics ==
Group of origin	Year		Year		Year		Year	
Group of origin	2000		2010		2020		2026	
Group of origin	Number	%	Number	%	Number	%	Number	%
Belgians with Belgian background	36,459	69,5	32,395	59,3	29,227	49,7	26,798	44,4
Belgians with foreign background	8,781	16,7	11,967	21,9	14,613	24,9	16,678	27,6
Neighbouring country	7,216	13,74	8,987	16,44	10,049	17,1	10,447	17,29
EU27 (excluding neighbouring country)	552	1,05	769	1,40	913	1,55	1,082	1,79
Outside EU 27	1,013	1,92	2,211	4,04	3,651	6,21	5,149	8,52
Non-Belgians	7,252	13,8	10,289	18,8	14,927	25,4	16,934	28
Neighbouring country	6,250	12,47	8,749	16,00	11,833	20,13	12,429	20,57
EU27 (excluding neighbouring country)	442	0,84	565	1,03	1,135	1,93	1,250	2,07
Outside EU 27	560	1,06	975	1,78	1,959	3,33	3,255	5,38
Total Population	52,492	100	54,651	100	58,767	100	60,410	100

== Notable people ==
- Philippe Adams, Formula One driver (20th century)
- Élise Crombez, supermodel (20th century)
- Marcel De Keukeleire: accordionist and music producer
- Raymond Devos, humorist and stand-up comedian (20th century)
- Viscount Leonard Pierre Joseph du Bus de Gisignies, politician (19th century)
- Alphonse Joseph Glorieux, missionary Roman Catholic bishop (19th century)
- Fantine Harduin (2005): Belgian actress (21st century)
- Yvonne Hubert, pianist and teacher (19th century)
- Maxime Lestienne, football player with Standard Liège (21st century)
- Louis-Philippe Loncke, explorer (20th century, member of The Explorers Club)
- Steed Malbranque, football player (20th century)
- Marcel Marlier (1930–2011): illustrator, cartoonist of Martine
- Jacques Mercier (1943): TV and radio show host, writer
- Charles Schepens, ophthalmologist (20th century)
- Frank Vandenbroucke (1974–2009): cyclist
- André Waignein (1942–2015): trumpet player and composer

== Twin cities ==
- Liévin, Pas-de-Calais, Hauts-de-France, France
- Fécamp, Seine-Maritime, Normandy, France
- Rheinfelden, Baden-Württemberg, Germany
- Barry, Vale of Glamorgan, Wales, United Kingdom

== See also ==
- R.E. Mouscron
- Royal Mouscron-Péruwelz
- Stade Le Canonnier
- Ronde de Mouscron
