= Peeters II Government =

- Cabinet of Flanders
- Incumbent
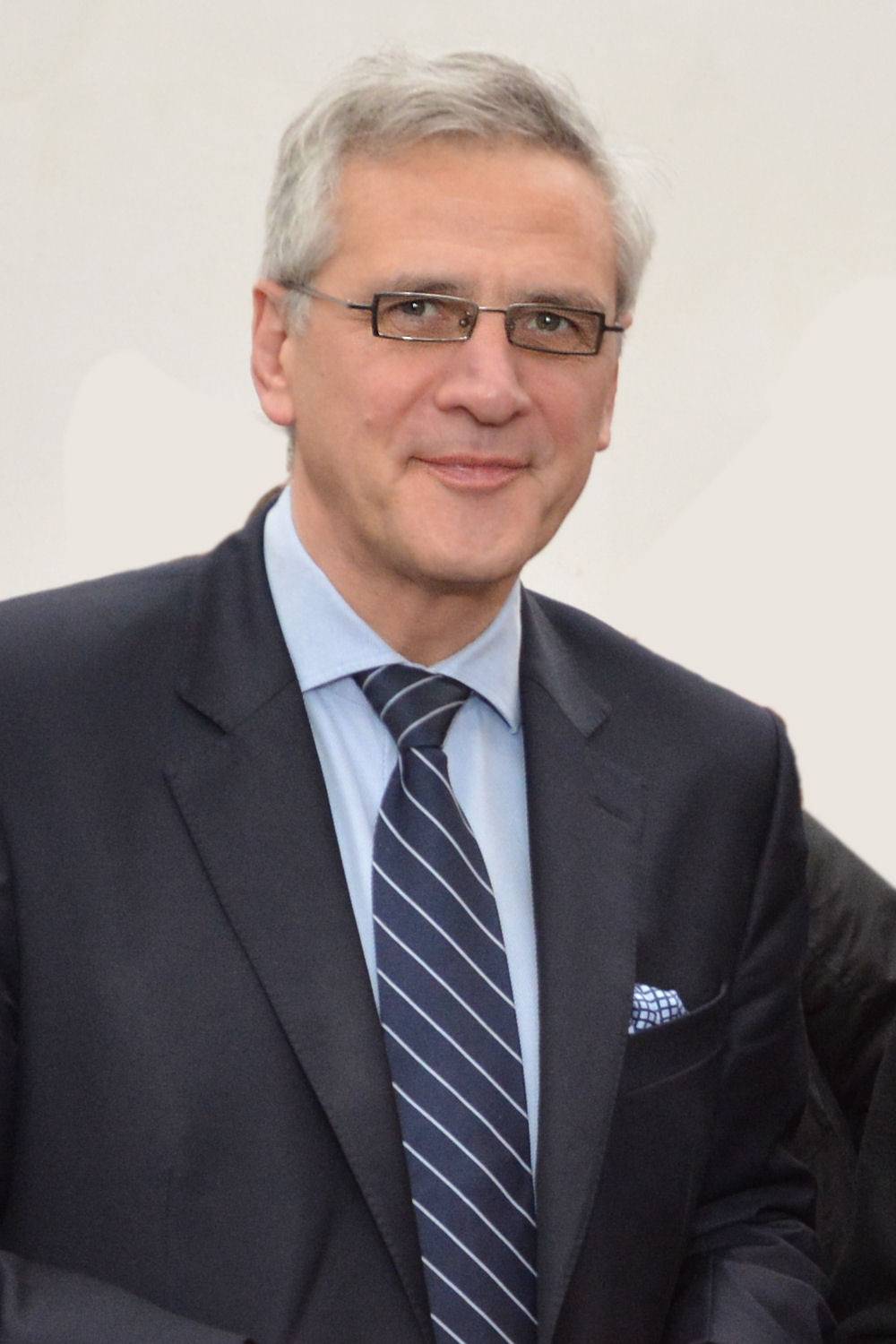
- Date formed: 13 July 2009
- Date dissolved: 25 July 2014

People and organisations
- Head of state: Albert II of Belgium; Philippe of Belgium
- Head of government: Kris Peeters
- Deputy head of government: Ingrid Lieten; Geert Bourgeois
- No. of ministers: 9
- Member party: CD&V sp.a N-VA
- Status in legislature: Coalition

History
- Election: 2009
- Predecessor: Peeters I
- Successor: Bourgeois

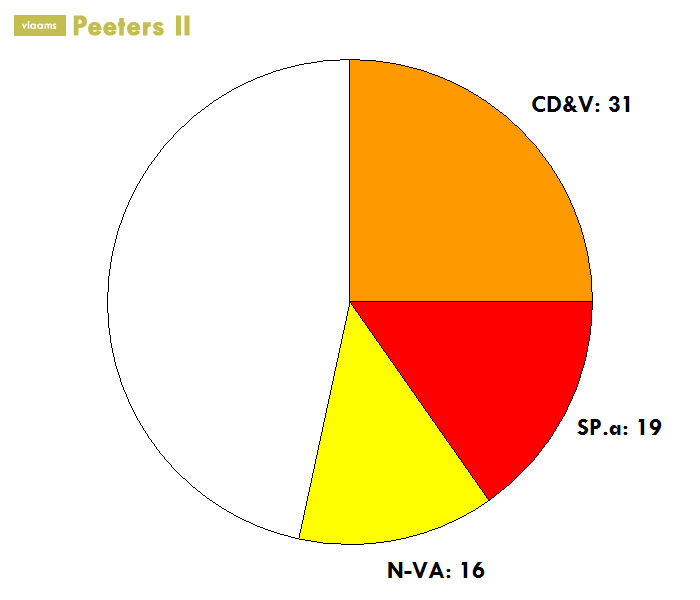
Parliamentary majority

The Peeters II Government (Regering-Peeters II) was the Flemish Government formed following the 2009 Flemish Parliament election. The cabinet consisted of a coalition of the Christian democratic CD&V, the social democratic sp.a and the nationalist N-VA. The largest opposition parties in the Flemish Parliament were far-right Vlaams Belang and liberal Open Vld.

== Composition ==
The Peeters II Government consists of the following nine ministers:

Flemish Government - Peeters II 2009-2014
Party	Name	Function
CD&V	Kris Peeters	Minister-President of the Flemish Government and Flemish Minister for Economy, Foreign Policy, Agriculture and Rural Policy
SP.A	Ingrid Lieten	Vice minister-president of the Flemish Government and Flemish Minister for Innovation, Public Investment, Media and Poverty Reduction
N-VA	Geert Bourgeois	Vice minister-president of the Flemish Government and Flemish Minister for Administrative Affairs, Local and Provincial Government, Civic Integration, Tourism and the Brussels Periphery
CD&V	Jo Vandeurzen	Flemish Minister for Welfare, Public Health and Family
CD&V	Hilde Crevits	Flemish Minister for Mobility and Public Works
SP.A	Freya Van den Bossche	Flemish Minister for Energy, Housing, Cities and Social Economy
N-VA	Philippe Muyters	Flemish Minister for Finance, Budget, Work, Town and Country Planning and Sport
CD&V	Joke Schauvliege	Flemish Minister for Environment, Nature and Culture
SP.A	Pascal Smet	Flemish Minister for Education, Youth, Equal Opportunities and Brussels Affairs

== See also ==
- Flanders in Action
- Di Rupo Government (Belgian federal government)
