= Bourgeois Government =

- Cabinet of Flanders
- Incumbent
- Date formed: 25 July 2014
- Date dissolved: 1 July 2019

People and organisations
- Head of state: Philippe of Belgium
- Head of government: Geert Bourgeois
- No. of ministers: 9
- Member party: N-VA; CD&V; Open Vld
- Status in legislature: Coalition

History
- Election: 2014
- Predecessor: Peeters II
- Successor: Homans

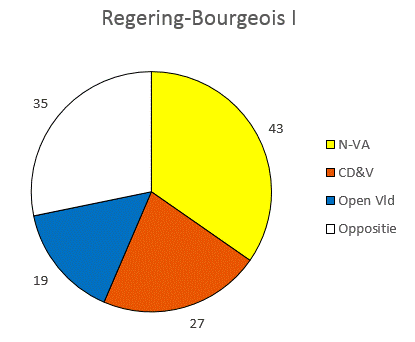
Parliamentary majority

The Bourgeois Government (Regering-Bourgeois) was the Flemish Government formed following the 2014 Flemish Parliament election. The cabinet consisted of a centre-right coalition of the nationalist New Flemish Alliance (N-VA), the Christian Democratic and Flemish party (CD&V) and the Open Flemish Liberals and Democrats (Open Vld). It had a large majority in the Flemish Parliament and the main opposition parties were the Socialist Party (sp.a), which had been part of nearly all previous governments in recent history, and the Green party.

As Flemish Minister-President Geert Bourgeois was elected to sit in the European Parliament following the 2019 European Parliament election in Belgium, he vacated his place in the government to fellow N-VA member Liesbeth Homans, who was sworn in on 2 July 2019 to lead the interim Homans Government composed of the same parties, as a new coalition based on the 2019 Belgian regional elections had not yet been formed.

== Formation ==
After the 2014 elections, N-VA and CD&V started negotiations to form a Flemish Government. However, since Open Vld was required for a Federal Government majority and they demanded to be in either both or neither government, they joined the negotiations later.

== Composition ==
The Bourgeois Government consisted of the following nine ministers:

Following the 25 May 2014 election, N-VA (43 seats), CD&V (27 seats) and Open Vld (19 seats) parties formed a coalition.

Flemish Government - Bourgeois 2014-2019
Party	Name	Function
N-VA	Geert Bourgeois	Minister-President of the Flemish Government and Flemish Minister for Foreign Policy and Immovable Heritage
CD&V	Hilde Crevits	Vice minister-president of the Flemish Government and Flemish Minister for Education
Open Vld	Annemie Turtelboom (until April 29, 2016)	Vice minister-president of the Flemish Government and Flemish Minister for Finance, Budget and Energy
Open Vld	Bart Tommelein (from April 29, 2016 until November 30, 2018)	Vice minister-president of the Flemish Government and Flemish Minister for Finance, Budget and Energy
Open Vld	Lydia Peeters (from November 30, 2018)	Flemish Minister for Finance, Budget and Energy
N-VA	Liesbeth Homans	Vice minister-president of the Flemish Government and Flemish Minister for Public Governance, Civic Integration, Housing, Equal Opportunities and Poverty Reduction
CD&V	Jo Vandeurzen	Flemish Minister for Welfare, Public Health and Family
Open Vld	Sven Gatz (until November 30, 2018)	Flemish Minister for Media, Culture, Youth and Brussels
Open Vld	Sven Gatz (from November 30, 2018)	Vice minister-president of the Flemish Government and Flemish Minister for Media, Culture, Youth and Brussels
N-VA	Ben Weyts	Flemish Minister for Mobility and Public Works, the Brussels Periphery, Tourism and Animal Welfare
CD&V	Joke Schauvliege (until February 5, 2019)	Flemish Minister for Town and Country Planning, Environment and Nature
CD&V	Koen Van den Heuvel (from February 6, 2019)	Flemish Minister for Town and Country Planning, Environment and Nature
N-VA	Philippe Muyters	Flemish Minister for Work, Economy, Innovation, Scientific Policy and Sport

=== Replacements ===
- Minister Annemie Turtelboom resigned on 29 April 2016. She was replaced by Bart Tommelein, then secretary of state in the federal Michel Government.
- In January 2019, Bart Tommelein becomes mayor of Oostende. He was replaced by Lydia Peeters taking over the function of Minister of Finance, Budget and Energy, while minister Sven Gatz took over the position as vice minister-president for the Open Vld.
- In February 2019, Joke Schauvliege resigned following fierce criticism of her earlier statement where she described the climate demonstrations as a "set up game". Schauvliege was replaced by Koen Van den Heuvel.
