= Hilde Crevits =

Belgian politician

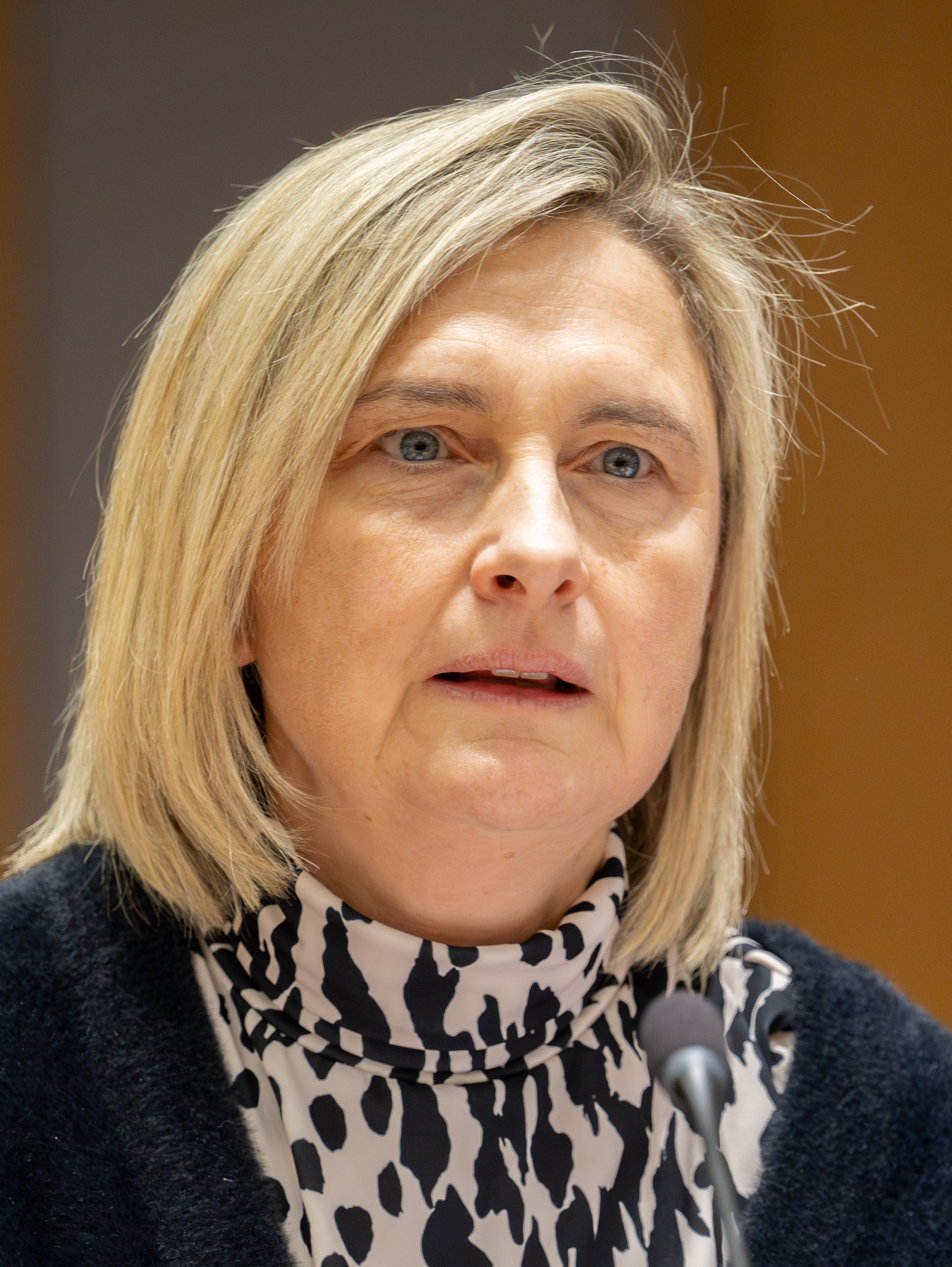

Vice Minister-President of the Flemish Government and Flemish Minister for Economy, Innovation, Work, Social economy and Agriculture
- Incumbent
- Assumed office 2 October 2019
- Prime Minister: Jan Jambon

Vice Minister-President of the Flemish Government and Flemish Minister of Education
- In office 25 July 2014 – 2 October 2019
- Prime Minister: Geert Bourgeois
- Preceded by: Pascal Smet

Flemish Minister of Mobility and Public Works
- In office 2009–2014
- Prime Minister: Kris Peeters
- Preceded by: Kathleen Van Brempt (Mobility)
- Succeeded by: Ben Weyts

Flemish Minister of Public Works, Energy, the Environment and Nature
- In office 2007–2009
- Prime Minister: Kris Peeters
- Preceded by: Kris Peeters
- Succeeded by: Freya Van den Bossche (Energy); Joke Schauvliege (Environment and Nature)

Personal details
- Born: Hilde Urbanie Julia Crevits; 28 June 1967 (age 59) Torhout, Belgium
- Party: CD&V
- Education: Ghent University
- Occupation: politician

Hilde Urbanie Julia Crevits (born 28 June 1967, in Torhout) is a Belgian politician from Flanders and member of the Christian Democratic and Flemish party who is currently the Flemish minister of Economy, Innovation, Work, Social economy and Agriculture.

Crevits graduated from Ghent University as a Licentiate of Law in 1990 and subsequently became a lawyer.

Crevits served on the provincial council of West Flanders from 1999 to 2004, when she was elected to the Flemish Parliament in the 2004 regional elections. From 2000 to 2007 she served as an alderman in Torhout.

After the 2007 Belgian federal elections, in the cabinet reshuffle of 28 June 2007, Crevits took over the competences of Kris Peeters in the Flemish Government as Flemish minister of Public Works, Energy, the Environment and Nature. After the 2009 regional elections she became Flemish minister of Mobility and Public Works in the Peeters II Government.

After the 2014 elections, she became the Vice-Minister-President and Minister of Education in the Bourgeois Government. Since 2 October 2019 she is Vice Minister-President of the Flemish Government and Flemish Minister for Economy, Innovation, Work, Social economy and Agriculture in the Jambon Government.

Since 9 May 2016 she has also been mayor of Torhout.

== Honours ==
- 2014: commander in the Order of Leopold.
