= Bert Anciaux =

Belgian politician

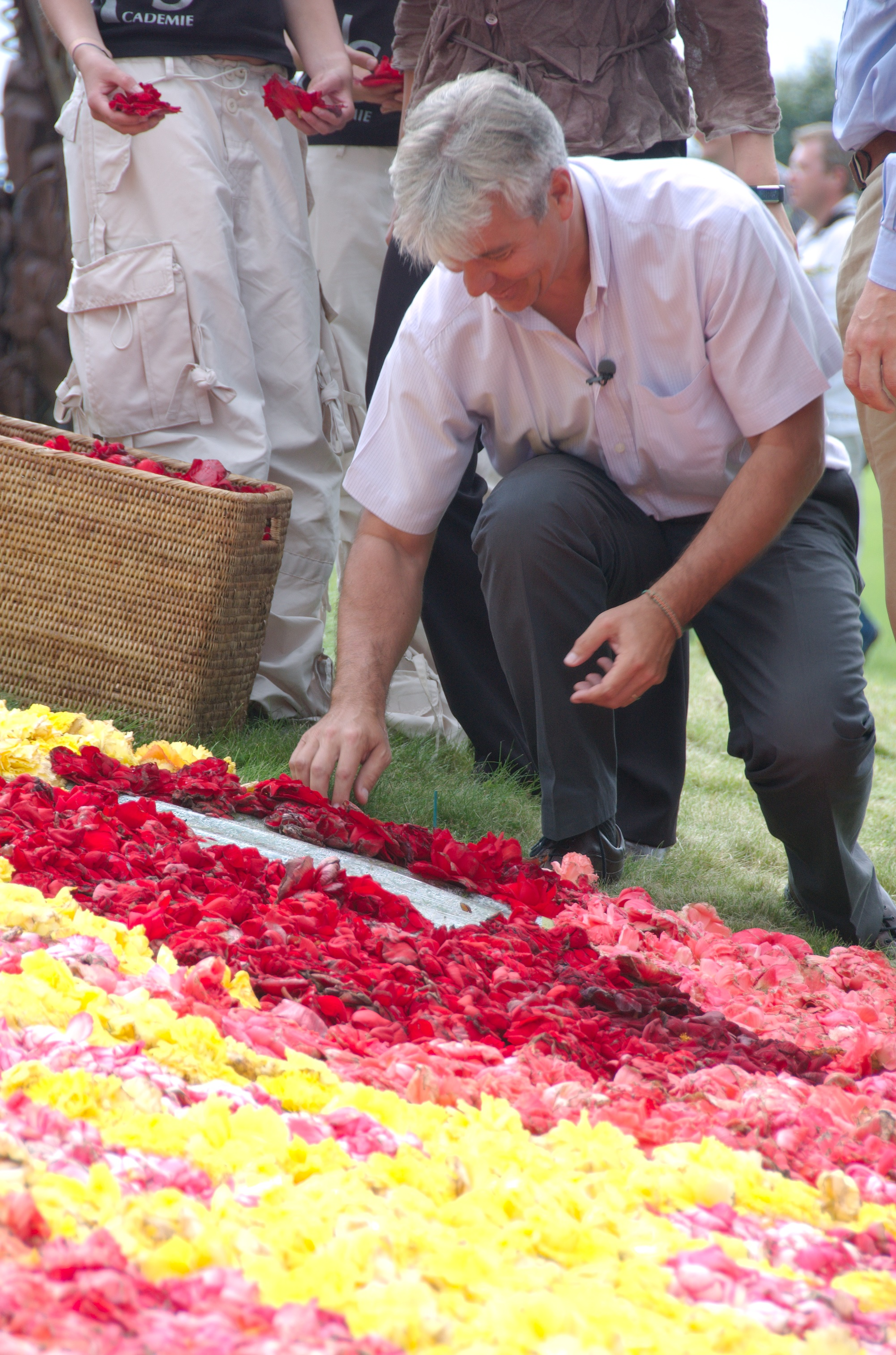

Flemish Minister for Housing and Urban policy
- In office 1999–2000
- Preceded by: Leo Peeters
- Succeeded by: Johan Sauwens

Flemish Minister for relations with Brussels
- In office 1999–2002
- Preceded by: Brigitte Grouwels
- Succeeded by: Guy Vanhengel
- In office 2004–2009
- Preceded by: Adelheid Byttebier
- Succeeded by: Pascal Smet

Flemish Minister for Culture and Youth
- In office 1999–2002
- Preceded by: Luc Martens
- Succeeded by: Paul Van Grembergen
- In office 2004–2009
- Preceded by: Paul Van Grembergen
- Succeeded by: Joke Schauvliege

Flemish Minister for Sport
- In office 2001–2002
- Preceded by: Luc Martens
- Succeeded by: Guy Vanhengel
- In office 2004–2009
- Preceded by: Marino Keulen
- Succeeded by: Philippe Muyters

Minister of Mobility and Economical Affairs
- In office 2003–2004
- Prime Minister: Guy Verhofstadt
- Preceded by: Laurette Onkelinx (Mobility); Fientje Moerman (Economical Affairs)
- Succeeded by: Renaat Landuyt (Mobility); Marc Verwilghen (Economical Affairs)

Personal details
- Born: 11 September 1959 (age 66) Merksem, Belgium
- Party: Volksunie (until 2001); Spirit (2001–2008); Vooruit (since 2008)
- Education: Free University of Brussels, dutch

Bert Jozef Herman Vic Anciaux (born 11 September 1959) is a Belgian politician and Vooruit faction leader in the Belgian Senate. He was one of the founders of Spirit (later known as the Flemish Progressives, then the Social Liberal Party, or SLP). Served as Minister for Culture, Youth and Sport in the Flemish Government from 2004 until 2009, he was also Minister for relations with the Brussels-Capital Region and the Brussels Parliament (Dutch: Minister voor Brusselse Aangelegenheden).

== Political career ==
=== Volksunie (1987–1998) ===
Anciaux was born into a political family. His father Vic Anciaux was chairman of the Volksunie (VU), a nationalist party, from 1979 until 1985. Bert first held office as a councilman in the City of Brussels in 1987, and in 1991, became a member of the provincial council of Flemish Brabant. He became chairman of the Volksunie in 1992, serving until 1998. From 1995 to 1999, he sat in the Belgian Senate.

=== Volksunie-iD21 (1998–2001) ===
Following the 1998 White Marches provoked by the publication of official reports on the Affaire Dutroux, Anciaux founded the think-tank, later political group, iD21, which aimed to confront the corruption and incompetence which the Dutroux affair had brought to light. In the 1999 Belgian general election, the combined Volksunie-iD21 list gained 8% of the vote, up from around 5% in 1995. Anciaux was elected to the European Parliament.

=== Spirit / Flemish Progressives (2001–2009) ===
With the collapse of the Volksunie in 2001, split between left and right factions led by Anciaux and Geert Bourgeois which became Spirit and New-Flemish Alliance (NV-A) respectively. A number of iD21 members joined Agalev, the Flemish green party, rather than Spirit.

In 2002, Anciaux stepped down as Minister for Culture in the Flemish government. Following the 2003 Federal election, where Anciaux and Spirit ran in a cartel with Socialist Party Different (SP.a), he was appointed Federal transport minister. In July 2004, he resigned this post and returned to his present position as Minister for Culture, Youth and Sport in Flanders.

=== Vooruit (2009–present) ===
In 2008, he left his party and has expressed the desire to launch a new "Social Project". He then joined the Flemish social-democratic party Vooruit, then called Sp.a. In 2010, he was elected to the Belgian Senate and took over the position of faction leader of Vooruit in 2012, when Marleen Temmerman resigned from politics.

== Honours ==
- Belgium : Commander of the Order of Leopold (6 June 2009)
- Netherlands : Knight Grand Cross in the Order of Orange-Nassau.
