= Biotech Fund Flanders =

The Biotech Fund Flanders (Dutch: Biotech Fonds Vlaanderen) was founded by the Flemish government in 1994 as an instrument to support the creation of new companies, explicitly in biotechnology. It provides venture capital to biotech companies in Flanders (Belgium). The fund has 21.7 million euro of capital and is managed by the GIMV.

== See also ==
- Flanders Interuniversity Institute of Biotechnology (VIB)
- Flanders Investment and Trade
- Institute for the promotion of Innovation by Science and Technology (IWT)
- Participatiemaatschappij Vlaanderen (PMV)
- Science and technology in Flanders
- Venture capital
