= Flanders in Action =

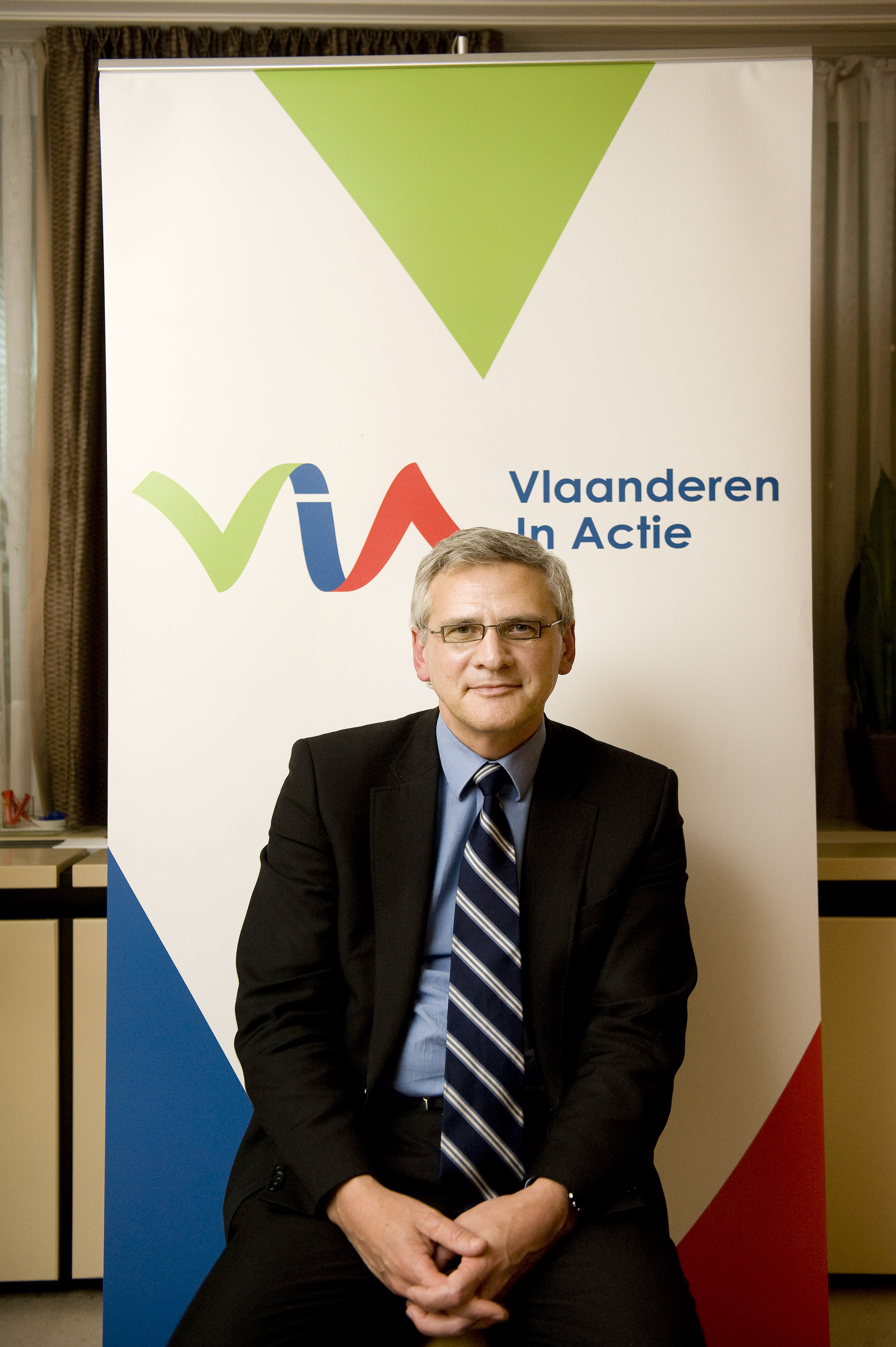
Kris Peeters, Minister-President of Flanders

Flanders in Action (Dutch: Vlaanderen in Actie – ViA) is a social and economic action programme for the future of Flanders which was established by the Flemish government on 11 July 2006.

== See also ==
- Flanders
- Flanders Interuniversity Institute of Biotechnology (VIB)
- Flanders Investment and Trade (FIT)
- Flemish Council for Science Policy (VRWB)
- Flemish Energy Agency
- Flemish Institute for Technological Research (VITO)
- GIMV
- Institute for the promotion of Innovation by Science and Technology (IWT)
- Participatiemaatschappij Vlaanderen
- Politics of Flanders
- Science and technology in Flanders
- Technopolis
