= Annemie Turtelboom =

Belgian politician (born 1967)

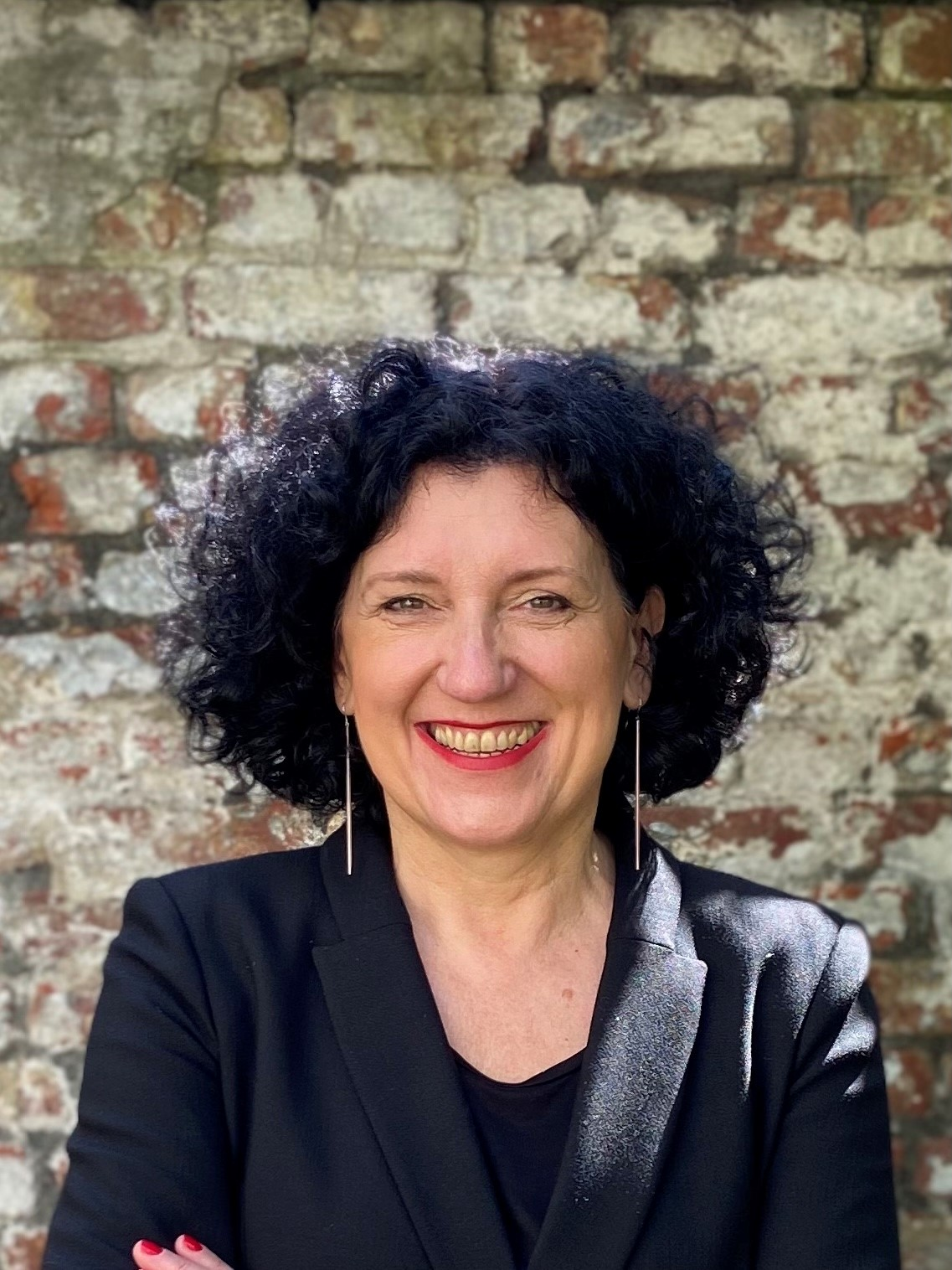
- Turtelboom in 2021

Member of the European Court of Auditors for Belgium
- Incumbent
- Assumed office 1 May 2018
- President: Klaus-Heiner Lehne; Tony Murphy
- Preceded by: Karel Pinxten

Flemish Minister of Finance and Energy
- In office 25 July 2014 – 29 April 2016
- Prime Minister: Geert Bourgeois
- Preceded by: Philippe Muyters (Budget); Freya Van Den Bossche (Energy)
- Succeeded by: Bart Tommelein

Minister of Justice
- In office 6 December 2011 – 25 July 2014
- Prime Minister: Elio Di Rupo
- Preceded by: Stefaan De Clerck
- Succeeded by: Maggie De Block

Minister of the Interior
- In office 17 July 2009 – 6 December 2011
- Prime Minister: Herman Van Rompuy; Yves Leterme
- Preceded by: Guido De Padt
- Succeeded by: Joëlle Milquet

Personal details
- Born: 22 November 1967 (age 58) Ninove, Belgium
- Party: Open Flemish Liberals and Democrats

Annemie Turtelboom (born 22 November 1967) is a former Belgian minister, who served in the Federal Government of Belgium as a member of the Open VLD party, initially as minister for Asylum and Migration, and later Home Affairs and Justice. She has also served as minister of Finance, Budget and Energy in the Flemish Government. After leaving politics, she became the Belgian member of the European Court of Auditors, a position she has held since 2018.

== Early career ==
Annemie Turtelboom graduated from the Katholieke Universiteit Leuven in 1993 with an MA in economics, having previously obtained a Teaching Certificate from the Guardini Institute in Antwerp in 1988. She proceeded to teach economics at KU Leuven for ten years where she was appointed head teacher. Her lectures ranged from primarily marketing and statistics, to banking and insurance.

== Political career ==
Turtelboom started her political life as a member of the Christian Democratic and Flemish party's youth wing, rising to the position of vice-chair. In 2001, she and other members of the so-called "Yanko Group" left the party to join the Nieuwe Christen-Democraten (NCD) group of Johan Van Hecke and Karel Pinxten, which later joined the Open VLD. In 2003, Turtelboom entered the Belgian Federal Parliament as a member of Open VLD.

== Minister In The Federal Government ==
Minister of Migration and Asylum

In 2008, she was appointed as Minister of Migration and Asylum Policy in the Leterme I Government. During her time in the office, she regularised the status of asylum seeker families who had school-going children, and been in Belgium for at least five years. This gave these families resident permits to live and work in Belgium.

Minister of the Interior

She was appointed Minister of the Interior in the succeeding Van Rompuy Government on 17 July 2009, and retained that office in the Leterme II Government, which took office on 24 November 2009.

During this time, the country faced several catastrophes, such as an explosion in Liege, widespread flooding across the country, and the Halle train collision, the deadliest rail accident in Belgium in over fifty years.

Following rioting in Brussels in 2009, a zero tolerance approach to street crime was instigated in certain districts. Turtelboom stated that vehicle thefts fell by 48% and armed robberies by 17% within months of the policy being launched.

Minister of Justice

In 2011, Turtelboom was appointed as Minister of Justice - the first woman to take the position in Belgian history - in the government of Elio Di Rupo. At the outset of her term, she set out three priorities: quicker and more efficient punishment of crimes; reform of the judicial districts, streamlining them by making them fewer and larger, and digitalisation of the system's databases and processes. She oversaw the opening of three new prisons, in Beveren, Leuze and Marche-en-Famenne. In 2013, Turtelboom released €2.7m for the setting up of "fast-track" courts, to quickly try perpetrators of petty crime, and ease the work load of the regular court system. She also tightened up the rules for the acquisition of Belgian passports, requiring that applicants be capable of speaking one of the country's official languages (French, Dutch or German) and have been resident in Belgium for five years. The stricter requirements saw the number of passports handed out drop from an average of 40,000 annually to under 5,000.

As the sitting Justice Minister, she read out at the abdication act at the ceremony in which Albert II of Belgium transferred the crown to his son Philippe of Belgium in 2013.

She left that office in 2014 to take up a position in the Flemish Government.

== Minister In The Flemish Government ==
From 25 July 2014, Turtelboom took up the position of vice minister-president and Flemish minister of Finance, Budget and Energy in the Bourgeois Government (2014-2019).

During her time in the role, she introduced policies to "green" vehicle taxes, by matching tax levels to emissions.

On 29 April 2016, she resigned from her function as minister in the Flemish government, but retained her position as a member of parliament. She later took up the position as Belgian member of the European Court of Auditors.

== European Court of Auditors, 2018-present ==
In January 2018, the Belgian government nominated Turtelboom as a member of the European Court of Auditors. Turtelboom is currently the Belgian Member of the Court, and the dean of the Court's Chamber II - Chamber II — Investment for cohesion, growth and inclusion. Her portfolio includes audit work related to EU budget, EU public finance, policies related to EU governance, financial instruments and technical assistance in the EU. Most recently, she led audits in the area of EU-China relations and passenger rights. Turtelboom was nominated for a new six-year term in 2023. During the European Parliament hearing on her re-nomination, she stated that "I am a strong advocate of sound financial management. As a percentage of the GDP, the European budget may be small, but we are still talking about billions, so ‘relatively small’ does not mean that this money, i.e., EU taxpayers’ money, should not be well-spent. We are not only the guardians of the EU finances but also the advocates of citizens’ concerns and I take this double responsibility very seriously. I have published several reports on EU finances, but also on topics highly relevant to citizens’ lives; and always strive to make my reports as accessible as possible. Clear and transparent communication is key to ensuring citizens’ trust in the European project".

Political offices
Preceded by Guido De Padt	Minister of the Interior; 2009–2011	Succeeded by Joëlle Milquet
Preceded by Stefaan De Clerck	Minister of Justice; 2011–2014	Succeeded by Maggie De Block
