= Participatiemaatschappij Vlaanderen =

Independent economic organisation

The Participatiemaatschappij Vlaanderen (PMV) is an independent organization owned by the Flemish government which supports economic investment initiatives in Flanders.

== History ==
The PMV was established on 31 July 1995 as a specialised subdivision of the GIMV and became an independent organization 26 June 1997.

== See also ==
- Agoria
- Biotech Fund Flanders
- Flanders in Action
- Flanders Interuniversity Institute of Biotechnology (VIB)
- Flanders Investment and Trade
- Institute for the promotion of Innovation by Science and Technology (IWT)

== Sources ==
- Participatiemaatschappij Vlaanderen
- Participatiemaatschappij Vlaanderen
