= Liaison Agency Flanders-Europe =

The Liaison agency Flanders-Europe (Dutch: Vlaams-Europees Verbindingsagentschap), or VLEVA for short is a nonprofit organisation founded in 2006 at the behest of Flemish Minister for Foreign Affairs Geert Bourgeois (N-VA). The organisation came into being as a public-private partnership (PPP) between the Flemish Government and Flemish civil society.

VLEVA aims to bridge the gap between Flanders and Europe in both directions. The agency wants to involve Flanders more closely in European policy and ensures that Flemish stakeholders are informed correctly and in time.

== Members & Partners ==
VLEVA has following members:

- ACV Innovatief vzw
- Agoria
- Belgian Nuclear Forum
- De Blauwe Cluster
- Boerenbond
- Bond Beter Leefmilieu
- Brussels Airport Company
- Comeos
- Cultuurloket
- Digitaal Vlaanderen
- Embuild Vlaanderen
- essenscia
- Fevia
- Fedustria
- GO! onderwijs van de Vlaamse Gemeenschap
- Gezinsbond
- Instituut voor Landbouw-, Visserij- en Voedingsonderzoek (ILVO)
- Interuniversitair Micro-Electronica Centrum VZW (imec)
- De Lijn
- North Sea Port
- pharma.be
- Port of Antwerp-Bruges
- Provinciaal Onderwijs Vlaanderen
- Provincie Limburg
- SYNTRA
- Toerisme Vlaanderen
- Transport en Logistiek Vlaanderen
- Unie van Zelfstandige Ondernemers (UNIZO)
- Vereniging van de Vlaamse Provincies (VVP)
- Vereniging van de Vlaamse Steden en Gemeenten (VVSG)
- Vereniging voor Social-Profit Ondernemingen (Verso)
- Vlaams Centrum voor Agro- en Visserijmarketing (VLAM)
- Vlaams Instituut voor de Zee (VLIZ)
- Vlaams Netwerk van Ondernemingen (Voka)
- Vlaamse Hogescholenraad
- Vlaamse Instelling voor Technologisch Onderzoek (VITO)
- VITO Kenniscentrum Water
- Vlaamse Interuniversitaire Raad (VLIR)
- Vlaamse Milieumaatschappij (VMM)
- De Vlaamse Waterweg
- Vlanot/IRBN

VLEVA also has a partnership with:

- Taalunie
- The Ministry of the German-speaking Community
