= Corporify =

Belgian software-as-a-service company

- Original authors: Maarten Poulussen; Andy Kellens; Olivier Van Borsel
- Developer: Corporify
- Initial release: 2017; 8 years ago
- Operating system: Web-based (cross-platform)
- Platform: SaaS
- Type: Legal entity management
- License: Proprietary
- Website: corporify.com

Corporify is a Belgian software-as-a-service (SaaS) platform for legal entity management based in Ghent, Belgium.

== History ==
Corporify was founded in 2017 by Maarten Poulussen, Andy Kellens, and Olivier Van Borsel. It was initially focused on the Benelux region and was included in Trends Legal Awards.

In late 2020, Corporify received a €1.2 million convertible loan from the Flemish investment company PMV. In 2023, Corporify raised €2.45 million in a funding round to fund international expansion.

== Platform ==
Corporify is a software-as-a-service platform that centralizes legal entity data, using digital share registers to model ownership structures and store related contracts and governance documents. It uses blockchain technology to link verified data to documents, enabling automatic updates to connected files when source information changes.

Corporify operates on a subscription model and supports automated document workflows, Ultimate Beneficial Owner (UBO) and Know Your Customer (KYC) reporting.
