= Frank Vandenbroucke =

Frank Vandenbroucke is the name of:

- Frank Vandenbroucke (politician) (born 1955), Belgian politician
- Frank Vandenbroucke (cyclist) (1974–2009), Belgian road racing cyclist
