= Jo Vandeurzen =

Belgian politician (born 1958)

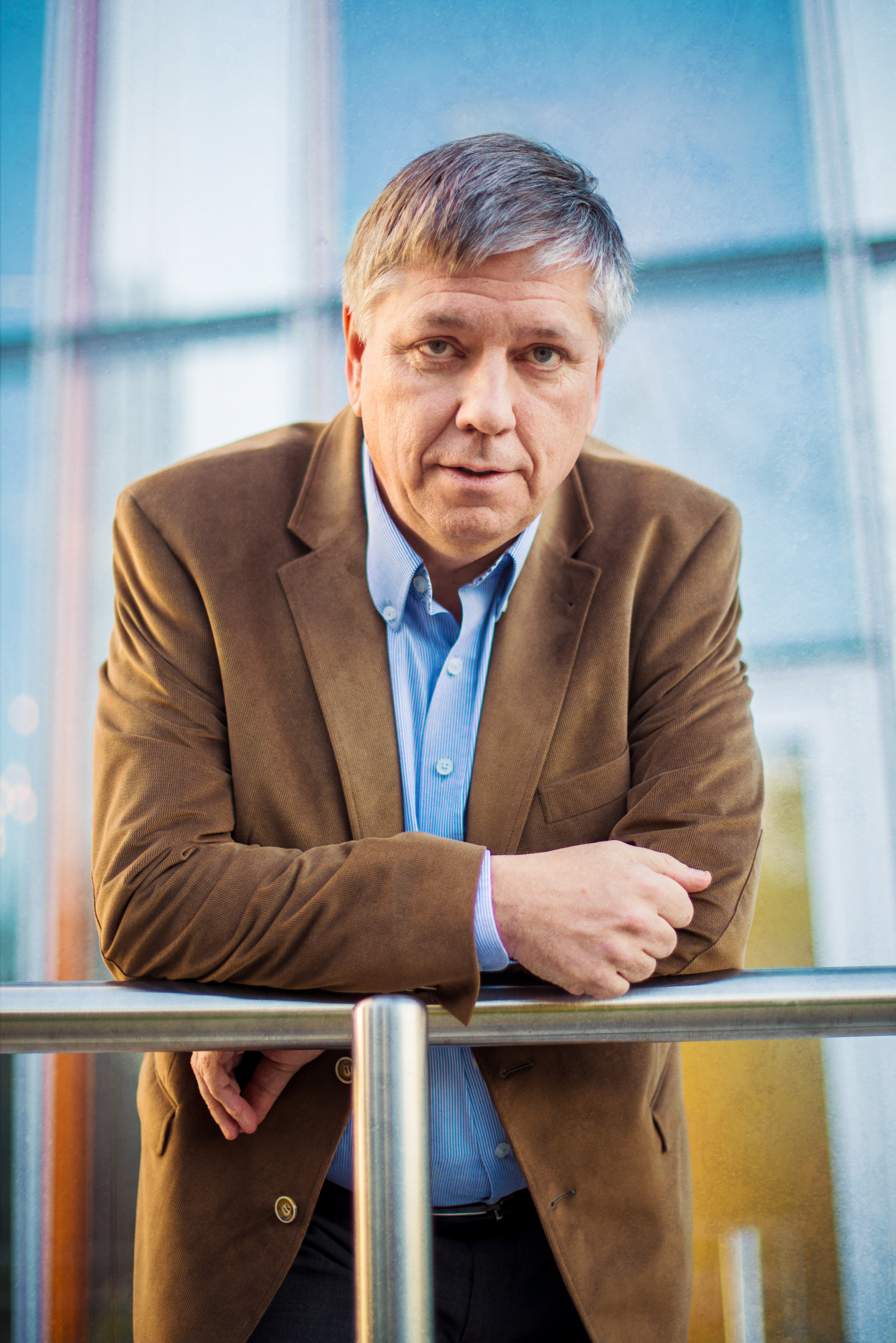

Flemish Minister of Public Health
- In office 13 July 2009 – 2 October 2019
- Preceded by: Veerle Heeren
- Succeeded by: Wouter Beke

Personal details
- Born: Johan Maria Gerardus Vandeurzen; 2 June 1958 (age 67) Heusden, Belgium
- Occupation: politician

Johan Maria Gerardus Vandeurzen (born 2 June 1958) is a Belgian politician, member of Christen-Democratisch en Vlaams (CD&V), a centrist Flemish Christian Democratic party.

Vandeurzen holds a Master of Laws degree from the Catholic University of Leuven. He works at Geyskens-Vandeurzen in Beringen.

He became federal representative in January 1993 as a successor to retiring Luc Dhoore.

In 2001, his party, the CVP, was rebranded into CD&V, of which he became secretary-general. In 2004 he became party leader.

He remained party leader until December 2007, when he became Minister of Justice in the interim federal Verhofstadt III Government. He became the Belgian Deputy Prime Minister and Minister for Justice and Institutional Reforms in the Leterme I Government, which took office on 20 March 2008. On 19 December 2008 he resigned after a crisis.

After the 2009 Flemish regional election, CD&V was the largest party and he received 69,223 preference votes. When the 2009–2014 Peeters II Government took office, he became the Flemish Minister for Welfare, Public Health and Family. He continues to hold this office in the 2014–2019 Bourgeois Government.

== Honours ==
- 2014: Commander in the Order of Leopold.

== Political career ==
- Chairman of CVP's division Genk (1983–1989)
- Member of the OCMW council in Genk (1989–1998)
- Chairman of the OCMW in Genk (1989–1993)
- Member of the national CVP's bureau (1989–1992)
- Belgian representative (1993 – )
- Member of the city council in Genk (1995–2004; 2012–2015)
- Leader of the CVP in the municipal council of Genk (1995–1998)
- Secretary-general of CD&V (2001–2004)
- Temporary chairman of CD&V (2004)
- Thairman of CD&V (29 October 2004 – 21 December 2007)
- Belgian Minister of Justice since 21 December 2007 – 22 December 2008)
- Flemish Minister of Welfare, Public Health and Family (13 July 2009 – 2 October 2019)
