= Flemish Government =

Executive branch of Flemish Community and Region

- Vlaamse Regering
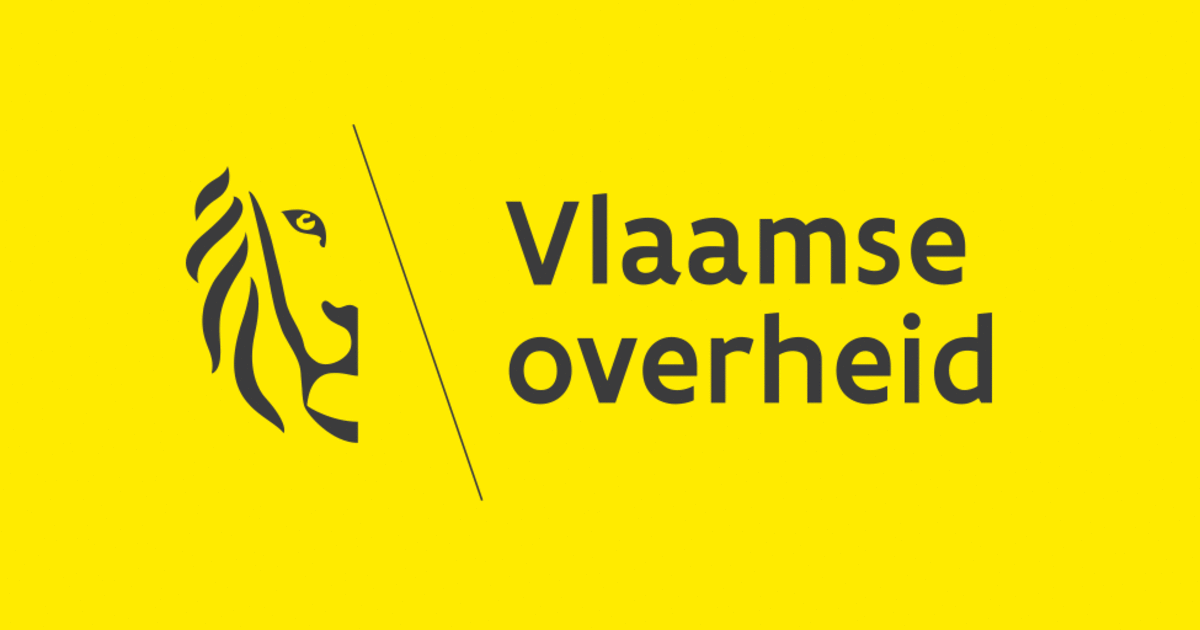
- Emblem of the Flemish administration (Dutch: Vlaamse overheid)

Overview
- Established: 22 December 1981; 44 years ago
- Polity: Flanders (Community & Region)
- Leader: Minister-President
- Appointed by: Flemish Parliament
- Responsible to: Flemish Parliament
- Annual budget: € 44.7 billion (2018)
- Headquarters: Place des Martyrs / Martelaarsplein; 1000 City of Brussels, Brussels-Capital Region, Belgium
- Website: www.flanders.be

The Flemish Government (Dutch: Vlaamse regering [ˌvlaːmsə rəˈɣeːrɪŋ]) is the executive branch of the Flemish Community and the Flemish Region of Belgium. It consists of a government cabinet, headed by the Minister-President and accountable to the Flemish Parliament, and the public administration (civil service) divided into 13 policy areas, each with an executive department and multiple agencies.

The Flemish Government cabinet consists of up to a maximum of eleven ministers, chosen by the Flemish Parliament. At least one minister must come from Brussels. The ministers are drawn from the political parties which, in practice, form the governing coalition. The Government is chaired by the Flemish Minister-President. Ministers head executive departments of the government administration. Ministers must defend their policies and performance in person before the Flemish Parliament. The Flemish Government must receive and keep the confidence of the Flemish Parliament. Until 1993 the Flemish Government was called the Flemish Executive (Vlaamse Executieve).

== Cabinet composition ==
=== Diependaele (2024-current) ===
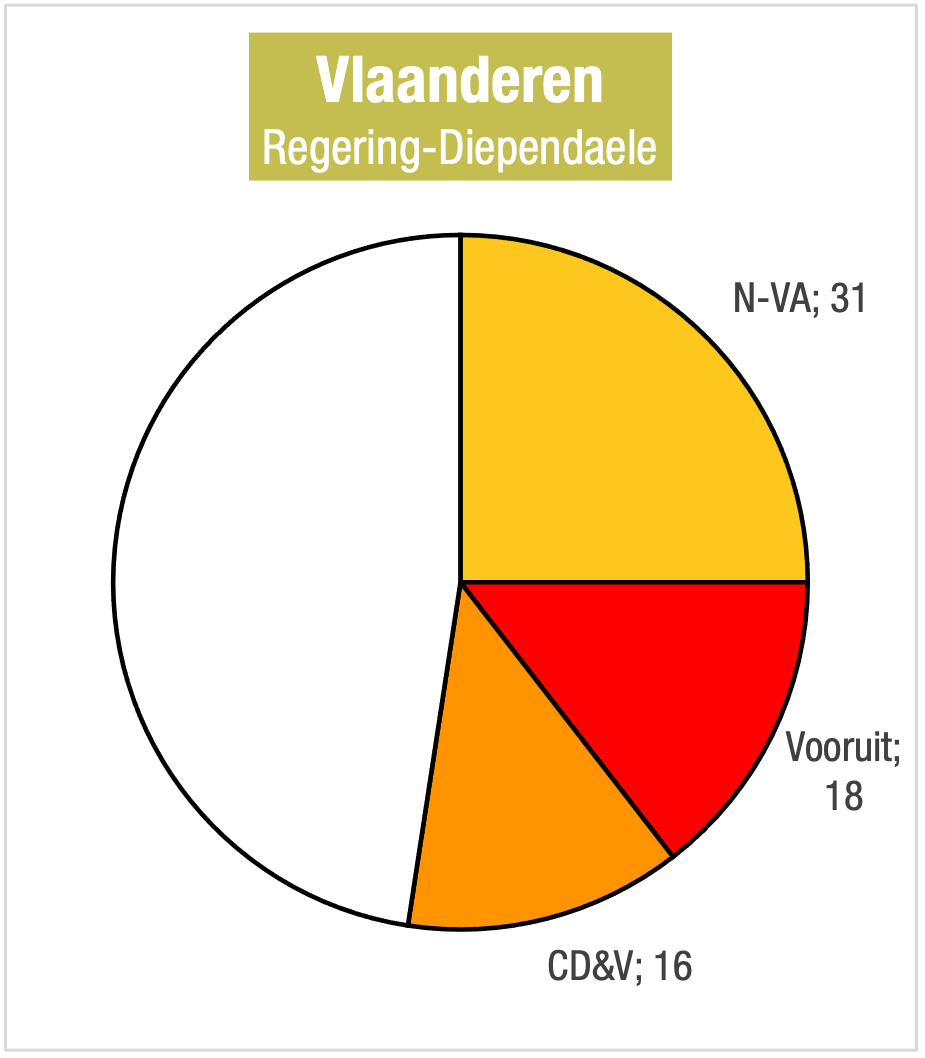
Government coalition 2024-present

The coalition replaced the Jambon Government following the 2024 Belgian federal election and again consisted of three parties, together having a narrow majority of 65 seats out of 124 seats total. The N-VA (31 seats) and CD&V (16 seats) were already part of the outgoing coalition, with Vooruit (18 seats) now replacing the Open Vld.

Flemish Government - Diependaele 2024-current
Party	Name	Function
N-VA	Matthias Diependaele	Minister-President of the Flemish Government and Flemish Minister for Economy, Innovation en Industry, External Affairs, Digitalisation, and Facility Management
N-VA	Ben Weyts	Vice minister-president of the Flemish Government and Flemish Minister for Budget and Finance, Vlaamse Rand, Real Estate Heritage, and Animal Welfare
Vooruit	Melissa Depraetere	Vice minister-president of the Flemish Government and Flemish Minister for Housing, Energy and Climate, Tourism, and Youth
CD&V	Hilde Crevits	Vice minister-president of the Flemish Government and Flemish Minister of the Interior, Urban and Rural Policy, Society, Integration and Inclusion, Administration, Social Economy, and Marine Fishing
N-VA	Zuhal Demir	Flemish Minister for Education, Justice, and Employment
N-VA	Annick De Ridder	Flemish Minister for Mobility, Public Works, Ports, and Sport
N-VA	Cieltje Van Achter	Flemish Minister for Brussels, and Media
Vooruit	Caroline Gennez	Flemish minister for Welfare and Poverty Alleviation, Culture, and Equal Opportunities
CD&V	Jo Brouns	Flemish Minister for Agriculture and Environment

=== Jambon (2019–2024) ===
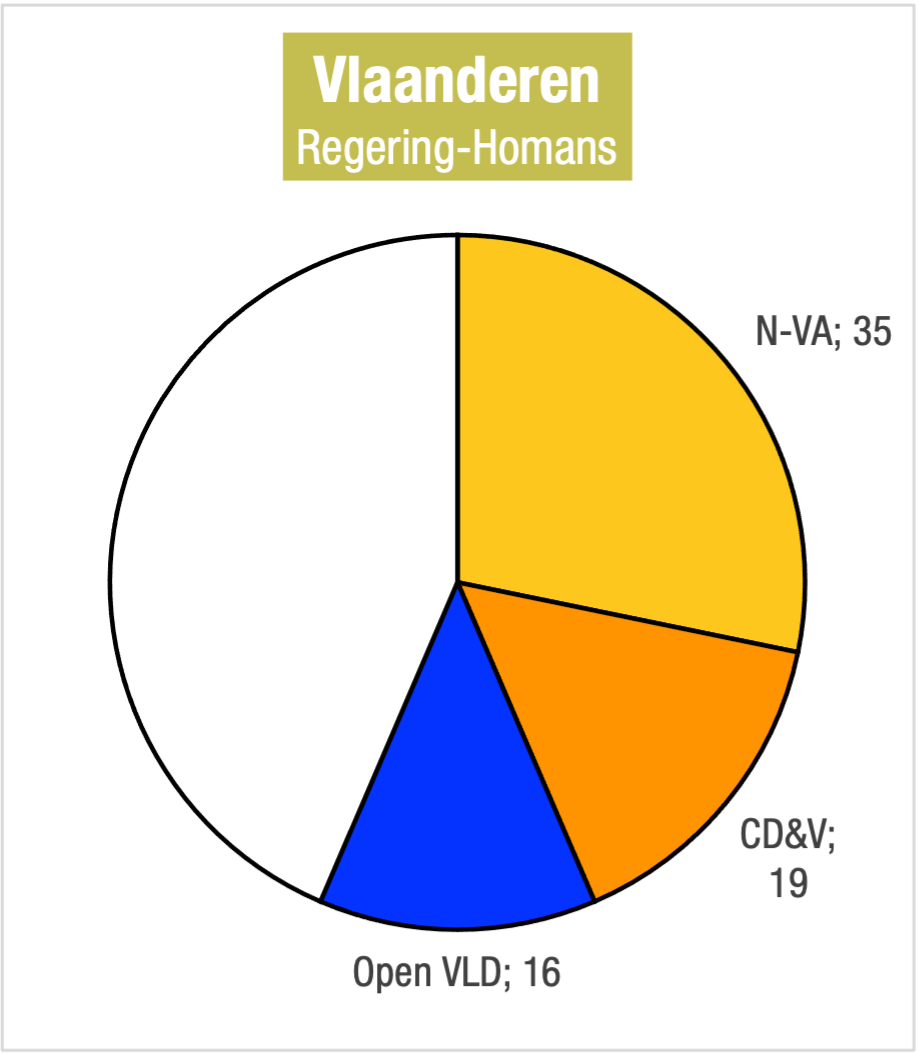
Government coalition 2019-2024

Flemish Government - Jambon 2019-current
Party	Name	Function
N-VA	Jan Jambon	Minister-President of the Flemish Government and Flemish Minister for Culture, Foreign Policy and Development Cooperation
CD&V	Hilde Crevits (until 17 May 2022)	Vice minister-president of the Flemish Government and Flemish Minister for Economy, Employment, Social Economy, Innovation and Agriculture
CD&V	Hilde Crevits (from 18 May 2022)	Vice minister-president of the Flemish Government and Flemish Minister for Welfare, Health and Family
Open Vld	Bart Somers (until 6 November 2023)	Vice minister-president of the Flemish Government and Flemish Minister for the Interior, Administrative Affairs, Integration, and Equal Opportunities
Open Vld	Gwendolyn Rutten (from 7 November 2023 until 2 August 2024)	Vice minister-president of the Flemish Government and Flemish Minister for the Interior, Administrative Affairs, Integration, and Equal Opportunities
N-VA	Ben Weyts	Vice minister-president of the Flemish Government and Flemish Minister for Education, Animal Welfare, Brussels Periphery and Sport
N-VA	Zuhal Demir	Flemish Minister for Justice and Enforcement, Environment, Energy and Tourism
CD&V	Wouter Beke (until 12 May 2022)	Flemish Minister for Welfare, Health, Family and Poverty Reduction
CD&V	Jo Brouns (from 18 May 2022)	Flemish Minister for Economy, Employment, Social Economy, Innovation and Agriculture
N-VA	Matthias Diependaele	Flemish Minister for Finance, Budget, Housing and Immovable Heritage
Open Vld	Lydia Peeters (until 2 August 2024)	Flemish Minister for Mobility and Public Works
Open Vld	Lydia Peeters (from 3 August 2024)	Vice minister-president of the Flemish Government and Flemish Minister for the Interior, Administrative Affairs, Integration, Equal Opportunities, Mobility and Public Works
CD&V	Benjamin Dalle	Flemish Minister for Brussels, Media, Youth and Poverty Reduction (Poverty Reduction from 18 May 2022)

=== Homans (2019) ===
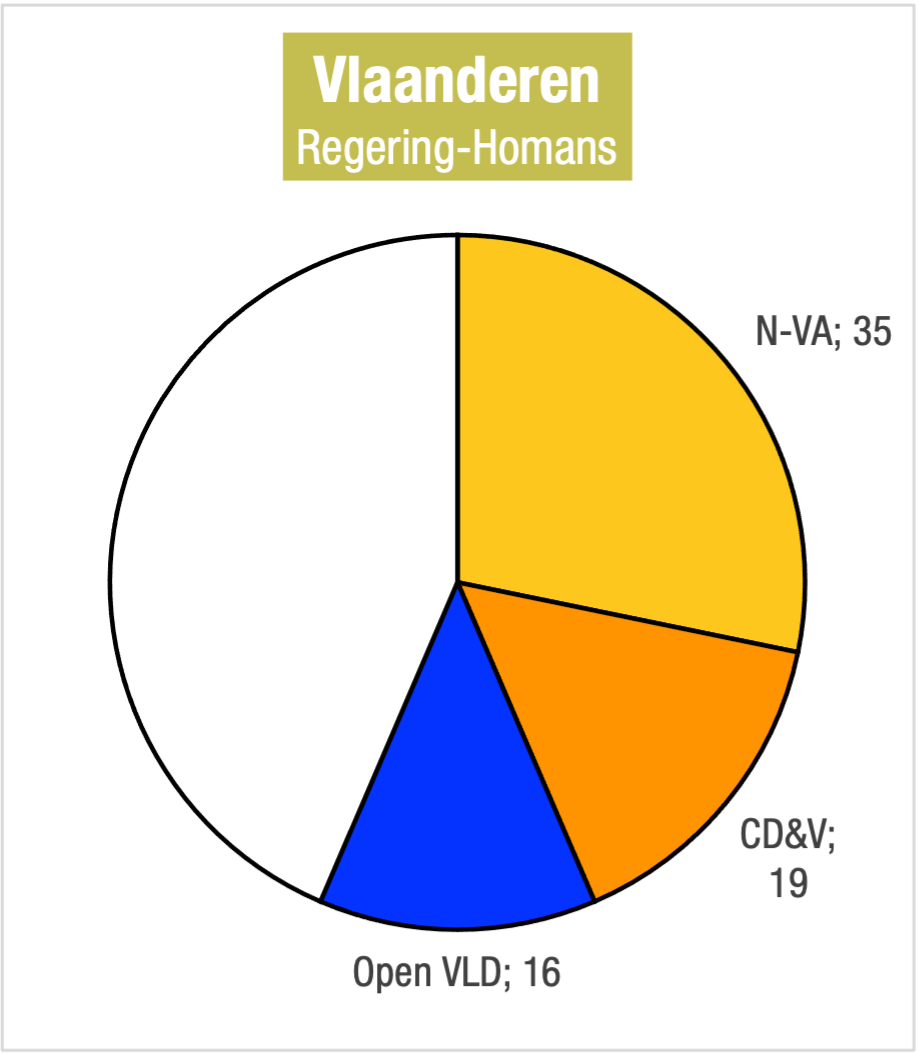
Government coalition 2019-present

Flemish Government - Homans 2019 (Jul-Oct)
Party	Name	Function
N-VA	Liesbeth Homans	Minister-President of the Flemish Government and Flemish Minister for Public Governance, Civic Integration, Housing, Equal Opportunities and Poverty Reduction
CD&V	Hilde Crevits	Vice minister-president of the Flemish Government and Flemish Minister for Education
Open Vld	Sven Gatz (until 18 July 2019)	Vice minister-president of the Flemish Government and Flemish Minister for Media, Culture, Youth and Brussels
Open Vld	Lydia Peeters (from 18 July 2019)	Vice minister-president of the Flemish Government and Flemish Minister for Finance, Budget, Energy, Media, Culture and Youth
N-VA	Ben Weyts	Vice minister-president of the Flemish Government and Flemish Minister for Mobility and Public Works, the Brussels Periphery, Tourism, Animal Welfare, Foreign Policy and Immovable Heritage
CD&V	Jo Vandeurzen	Flemish Minister for Welfare, Public Health and Family
Open Vld	Lydia Peeters (until 18 July 2019)	Flemish Minister for Finance, Budget and Energy
Open Vld	Sven Gatz (from 18 July 2019)	Flemish Minister for Brussels
N-VA	Philippe Muyters	Flemish Minister for Work, Economy, Innovation, Scientific Policy and Sport
CD&V	Koen Van den Heuvel	Flemish Minister for Town and Country Planning, Environment and Nature

=== Bourgeois (2014–2019) ===
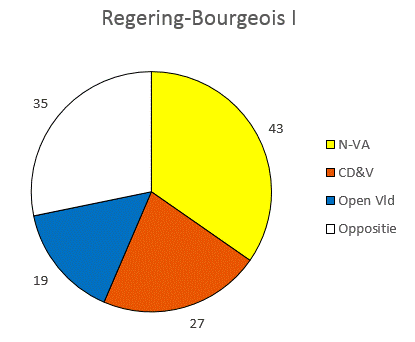
Government coalition 2014-2019

Flemish Government - Bourgeois 2014–2019
Party	Name	Function
N-VA	Geert Bourgeois	Minister-President of the Flemish Government and Flemish Minister for Foreign Policy and Immovable Heritage
CD&V	Hilde Crevits	Vice minister-president of the Flemish Government and Flemish Minister for Education
Open Vld	Annemie Turtelboom (until 29 April 2016)	Vice minister-president of the Flemish Government and Flemish Minister for Finance, Budget and Energy
Open Vld	Bart Tommelein (from 29 April 2016 until 30 November 2018)	Vice minister-president of the Flemish Government and Flemish Minister for Finance, Budget and Energy
Open Vld	Lydia Peeters (from 30 November 2018)	Flemish Minister for Finance, Budget and Energy
N-VA	Liesbeth Homans	Vice minister-president of the Flemish Government and Flemish Minister for Public Governance, Civic Integration, Housing, Equal Opportunities and Poverty Reduction
CD&V	Jo Vandeurzen	Flemish Minister for Welfare, Public Health and Family
Open Vld	Sven Gatz (until 30 November 2018)	Flemish Minister for Media, Culture, Youth and Brussels
Open Vld	Sven Gatz (from 30 November 2018)	Vice minister-president of the Flemish Government and Flemish Minister for Media, Culture, Youth and Brussels
N-VA	Ben Weyts	Flemish Minister for Mobility and Public Works, the Brussels Periphery, Tourism and Animal Welfare
CD&V	Joke Schauvliege (until 5 February 2019)	Flemish Minister for Town and Country Planning, Environment and Nature
CD&V	Koen Van den Heuvel (from 6 February 2019)	Flemish Minister for Town and Country Planning, Environment and Nature
N-VA	Philippe Muyters	Flemish Minister for Work, Economy, Innovation, Scientific Policy and Sport

=== Peeters II (2009–2014) ===
Following the 7 June 2009 election, CD&V (31 seats), N-VA (16 seats) and SP.A (19 seats) parties formed a coalition.

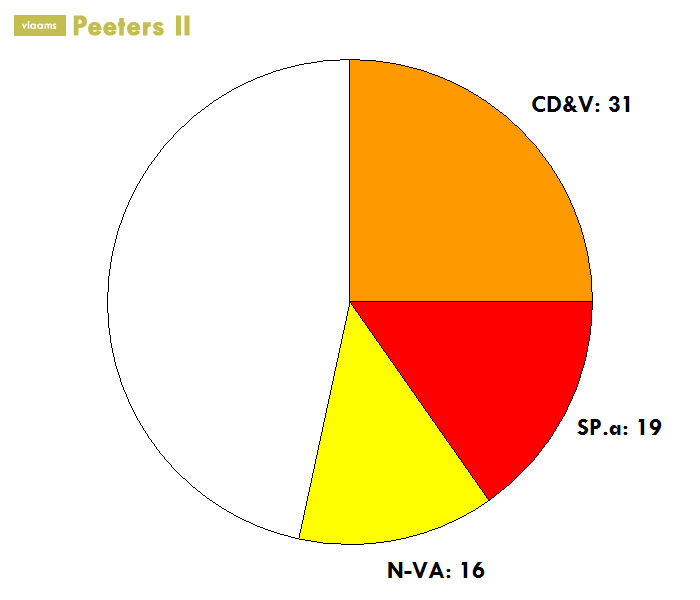
Government coalition 2009-2014

Flemish Government - Peeters II 2009–2014
Party	Name	Function
CD&V	Kris Peeters	Minister-President of the Flemish Government and Flemish Minister for Economy, Foreign Policy, Agriculture and Rural Policy
SP.A	Ingrid Lieten	Vice minister-president of the Flemish Government and Flemish Minister for Innovation, Public Investment, Media and Poverty Reduction
N-VA	Geert Bourgeois	Vice minister-president of the Flemish Government and Flemish Minister for Public Governance, Local and Provincial Government, Civic Integration, Tourism and the Brussels Periphery
CD&V	Jo Vandeurzen	Flemish Minister for Welfare, Public Health and Family
CD&V	Hilde Crevits	Flemish Minister for Mobility and Public Works
SP.A	Freya Van den Bossche	Flemish Minister for Energy, Housing, Cities and Social Economy
N-VA	Philippe Muyters	Flemish Minister for Finance, Budget, Work, Town and Country Planning and Sport
CD&V	Joke Schauvliege	Flemish Minister for Environment, Nature and Culture
SP.A	Pascal Smet	Flemish Minister for Education, Youth, Equal Opportunities and Brussels Affairs

=== Leterme I/Peeters I (2004–2009) ===
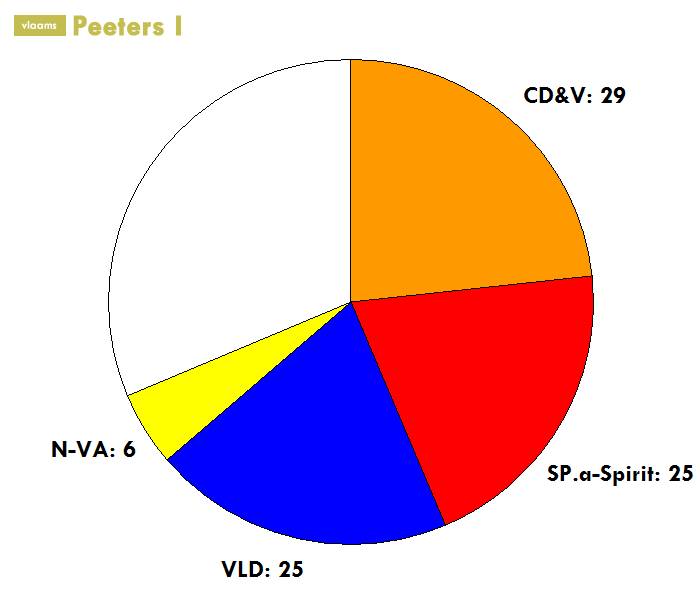
Government coalition 2007-2009

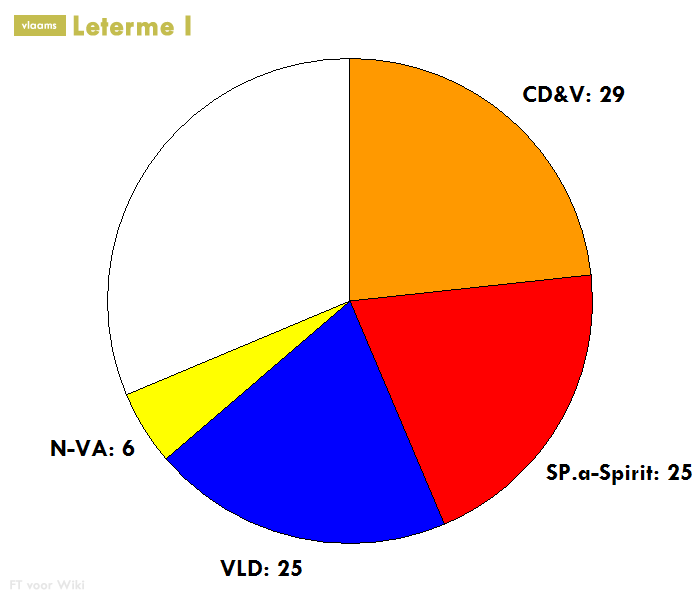
Government coalition 2004-2007

Following the 2004 election, CD&V (29 seats)/ N-VA (6 seats), sp.a/ Sociaal-Liberale Partij (25 seats) and Open Vld (19 seats) parties formed a coalition.

- From 19 July 2004 to 26 June 2007, the Minister-President of Flanders was Yves Leterme (CD&V), leading a coalition of CD&V-N-VA, VLD-Vivant, and SP.A-Vl.Pro.
- On 26 June 2007, in the aftermath of the 2007 Belgian general elections, Yves Leterme and Inge Vervotte resigned as minister-president and minister in the Flemish Government to take their seats in the Belgian Parliament. On 28 June Kris Peeters was sworn in as new minister-president, taking over the responsibilities of Leterme, and Vanackere and Crevits replaced Vervotte and Peeters as Flemish ministers.
- On 10 October 2007 Fientje Moerman resigned due to the fallout of a hiring scandal; she was replaced as vice-minister-president by Dirk Van Mechelen and as minister by Patricia Ceysens.
- On 22 September 2008 Geert Bourgeois (N-VA) was forced to resign due to pressure by the SP.A-Vl.Pro and Open VLD coalition partners because of his party's no confidence vote in the federal government of Leterme and their lack of trust in further negotiations by the Regions regarding the state reform. His portfolios of Administrative Affairs, Foreign Policy, Media and Tourism were taken over by minister-president Peeters.
- On 30 December 2008 Steven Vanackere resigned to become federal Minister of Civil Service and Public Enterprises. He was replaced in the Flemish Government by Veerle Heeren.

The composition at the end of the legislature:

Peeters I Flemish Government (2007-2009)
Party	Name	Function
CD&V	Kris Peeters	Minister-President; Minister for Institutional Reform, Ports, Agriculture, Sea Fisheries and Rural Policy
SP.A	Frank Vandenbroucke	Vice-Minister-President; Minister for Work, Education and Training
VLD	Dirk van Mechelen	Vice-Minister-President; Minister for Finance and Budget and Town and Country Planning
SP.A	Bert Anciaux	Minister for Culture, Youth, Sport and Brussels Affairs
VLD	Marino Keulen	Minister for Home Affairs, Urban Policy, Housing and Civic Integration
SP.A	Kathleen Van Brempt	Minister for Mobility, Social Economy and Equal Opportunities
CD&V	Hilde Crevits	Minister for Public Works, Energy, the Environment and Nature
VLD	Patricia Ceysens	Minister for Economy, Enterprise, Science, Innovation and Foreign Trade
CD&V	Veerle Heeren	Minister for Welfare, Public Health and Family

=== Dewael I (1999–2003)/Somers I (2003–2004) ===
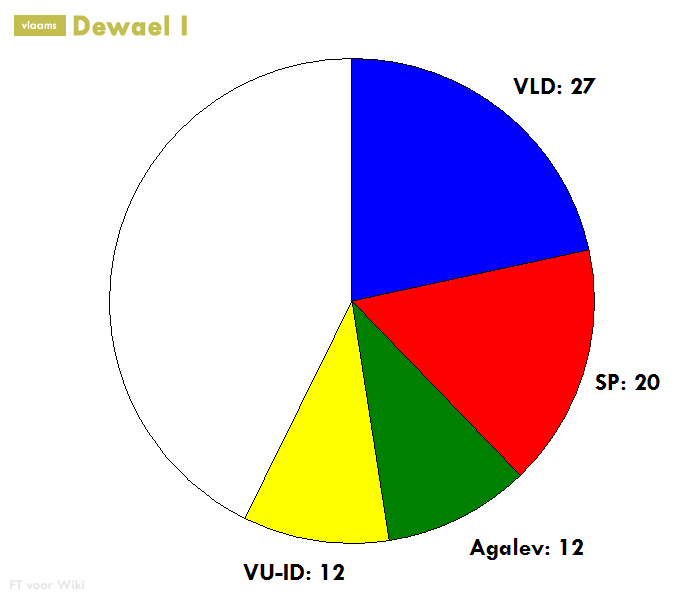
Government coalition 1999-2003

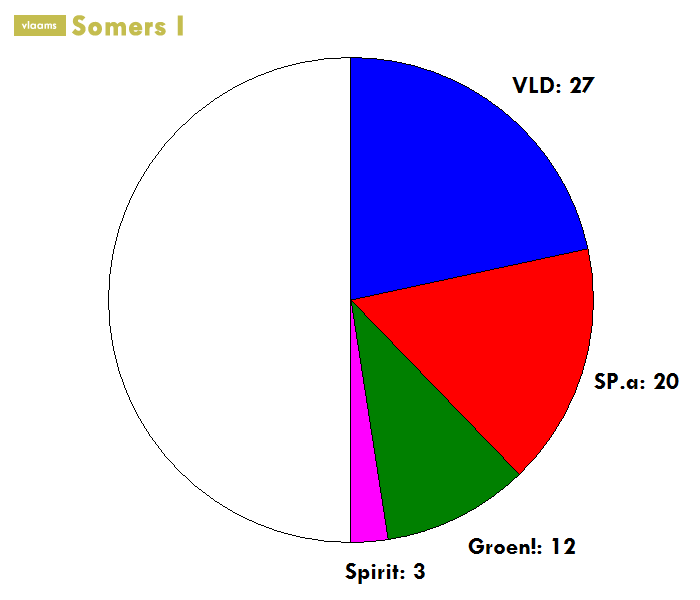
Government coalition 2003-2004

After the regional elections of 1999, a coalition of VLD, SP, Agalev and the VU was formed with Patrick Dewael (VLD) as Minister-President.

After the federal elections of June 2003, Patrick Dewael resigned as Minister-President and went to the federal political level. He was succeeded by Bart Somers as Flemish Minister-President until the end of term in 2004. Due to changes in political parties, the coalition was different:

- Volksunie (VU) fell apart. Instead, Spirit entered the coalition
- the SP was renamed to SP.a
- Agalev was renamed to Groen!

=== Van den Brande IV (1995–1999) ===
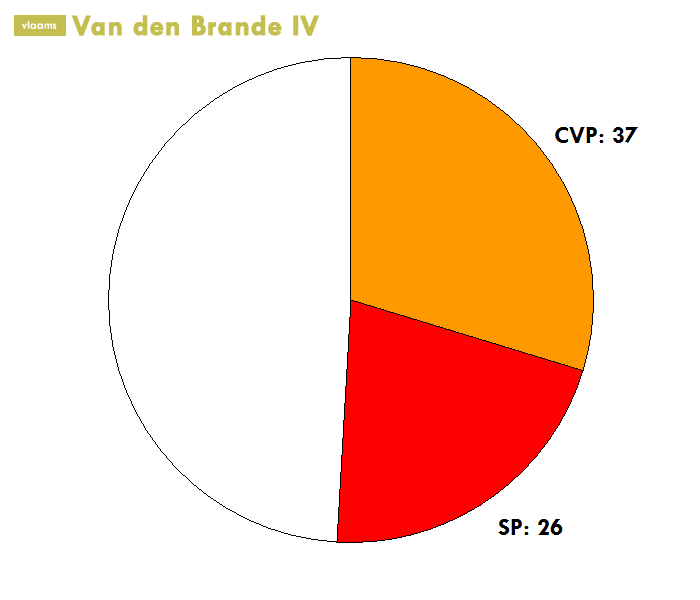
Government coalition 1995-1999

After the regional elections of 1995 (which were the first direct elections for the Flemish Parliament), a coalition of CVP and SP was formed.

Minister	Name	Party
Minister-President, Foreign Policy, European Affairs, Science and Technology	Luc Van den Brande	CVP
Vice-Minister-President, Education and Public Administration	Luc Van den Bossche	SP
Environment and Labour	Theo Kelchtermans	CVP
Finance, Budget and Health Policy	Wivina Demeester	CVP
Public Works, Transport and Spatial Planning	Eddy Baldewijns	SP
Economy, SME, Agriculture and Media	Eric Van Rompuy	CVP
Home Affairs, Urban Policy and Housing	Leo Peeters	SP
Culture, Family Policy and Welfare	Luc Martens	CVP
Brussels Affairs and Equal en Equal Opportunities Policy	Anne Van Asbroeck	SP

== List of Flemish Minister-Presidents ==
Name	Period	Party	Comments
Rika De Backer	1974 – 1981	CVP	Only of Flemish Community
Gaston Geens	22 December 1981 – 21 January 1992	CVP	
Luc Van den Brande	21 February 1992 – 1999	CVP	
Patrick Dewael	13 July 1999 – 5 June 2003	VLD	
Bart Somers	11 June 2003 – 20 July 2004	VLD	
Yves Leterme	20 July 2004 – 28 June 2007	CD&V	
Kris Peeters	28 June 2007 – 25 July 2014	CD&V	
Geert Bourgeois	25 July 2014 – 2 July 2019	N-VA	
Liesbeth Homans	2 July 2019 – 2 October 2019	N-VA	
Jan Jambon	2 October 2019 – present	N-VA	

== Administration ==
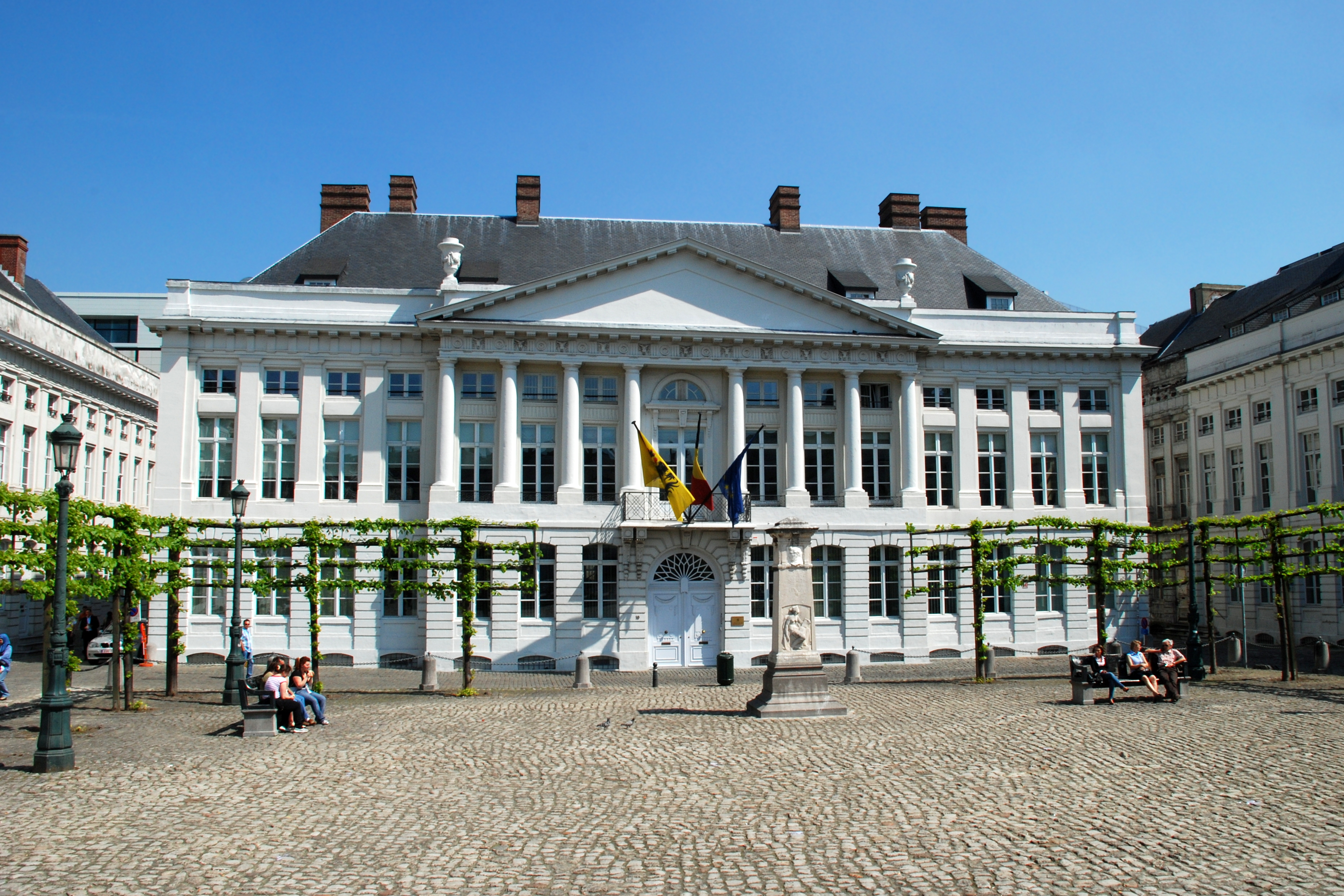
The Flemish Government cabinet offices are located at the Place des Martyrs/Martelaarsplein in Brussels

The Flemish administration (Dutch: Vlaamse overheid) denotes the Flemish civil service. With the 2006 reform program Better Administrative Policy (Dutch: Beter Bestuurlijk Beleid), the Flemish civil service is designed to make the Flemish public administration more efficient and transparent.

The tasks of the Flemish public administration are now organised in 13 policy areas. Each policy area comprises a department and a number of (semi-) independent government agencies. Only those with their own article are mentioned below.

The 11 policy areas are:

1. Public Governance and the Chancellery (KB)
2. Foreign Affairs (iV)
  - Liaison Agency Flanders-Europe (vleva)
  - Flanders Investment and Trade (FIT)
3. Finance and Budget (FB)
4. Education and Training (OV)
5. Economy, Science and Innovation (EWI)
  - Agency for Innovation by Science and Technology (IWT)
  - Participatiemaatschappij Vlaanderen (PMV)
  - National Botanic Garden of Belgium
6. Culture, Youth, Sport and Media (CJSM)
  - Agency for the Promotion of Physical Development, Sport and the Outdoor Recreation (Bloso)
  - Royal Museum of Fine Arts Antwerp (KMSKA)
7. Welfare, Public Health and Family (WVG)
  - Care Inspectorate
8. Agriculture and Fisheries (LV)
9. Work and Social Economy (WSE)
10. Mobility and Public Works (MOW)
  - Flemish Transport Company "De Lijn"
11. Environment (OMG)
  - Flemish Energy Agency (VEA)
  - Immovable Heritage

Several other institutes, such as the Flemish Opera and the Flemish Institute for Technological Research (VITO), were not incorporated into the above structure.

Every year, the Minister-President presents the current state of affairs in Flanders and the Government's plans for next year during the September Declaration on the fourth Monday in September.

== Budget ==
2018 Flemish budget
1. Education (29.6%)
2. Well-being, Health, Family (27.2%)
3. Chancellery and Governance (8.90%)
4. Employment and Social Economy (8.30%)
5. Mobility and Public Works (8.20%)
6. Other domains (17.8%)

The below figures use the 2018 budget as example, which had €44.7 billion in expenses and €42.3 billion in revenue.

The revenue comes from the following sources:

- 56% – Special financing law: the so-called "shared taxes" and "merged taxes" which the federal government raises through income taxes and VAT and partially transfers to the communities and regions based on a complex formula
- 34% – Fiscal autonomy
  - 18% – Opcentiemen: additional "centimes" to the federal income tax (the height of which can be set by the Flemish Government)
  - 16% – Regional taxes (taxes under the proper authority of the Flemish Government), such as the traffic tax and inheritance tax
- 10% – Other revenues

The expenses are as follows per policy area:

€13.2 billion	Education and Training	Mostly wages of education personnel
€12.1 billion	Welfare, Public Health and Family	E.g. child benefits
€3.96 billion	Chancellery and Governance	Mostly funds for local governments (provinces, cities and other municipalities)
€3.69 billion	Work and Social Economy	Mostly service vouchers
€3.67 billion	Mobility and Public Works	Mostly the public transportation company De Lijn and road infrastructure and road safety
€2.52 billion	Finances and Budget	Mostly financial incentives for private property
€2.04 billion	Spatial	E.g. management of immovable heritage and sustainable energy
€1.66 billion	Economy, Science and Innovation	Supporting entrepreneurship, scientific research and innovation
€1.29 billion	Culture, Youth, Sports and Media	Mostly the public broadcaster VRT and sports
€0.19 billion	Agriculture and Fisheries	Mostly the Agriculture Investment Fund
€0.17 billion	international Flanders	Tourism, international entrepreneurship, development aid and international relations
€0.13 billion	Higher Entities	Operating costs of the ministerial cabinets and the Flemish Parliament

== Projects ==
The Flemish Government owns the rights to Flanders Today, an English-speaking online and print newspaper focused on current affairs in Flanders and Brussels. The project was launched in 2007 by Geert Bourgeois – then Minister of Foreign Affairs and Tourism -, for three main reasons:

- Facilitating the integration of expats living in the region by informing them of the region's current events.
- Informing international journalists about the region, as most foreign correspondents based in Brussels get their news from the French-speaking press because the majority cannot read Dutch. Flanders Today would act as a counterweight to that side of every story.
- Informing diplomats, investors, potential tourists and others outside of Belgium's borders about the region.

In May 2017, the Flemish Government announced it would not be rebidding the Flanders Today project. Both the print and the online version of the paper are to be shut down in October 2017.

== See also ==
- Flanders
- Flanders in Action
- Flemish Community Commission
- Government of the Brussels-Capital Region
- Government of the French Community
- Politics of Flanders
