= Flanders Investment and Trade =

Flanders Investment and Trade (FIT) was founded by the Flemish government in 2005, by the fusion of 'Export Flanders' and 'Service of Investment in Flanders'. FIT helps Flemish companies expand their business abroad and assists foreign companies in finding Flemish suppliers of quality goods and services. Flanders Investment and Trade facilitate investment projects in Flanders and give support to Flemish export companies. The FIT is headed by Piet Demunter.

FIT has its headquarters in Brussels (Belgium) and has 99 offices around the world (of which 5 are in Flanders). These offices provide free information and support to both foreign investors and Flemish exporters.

== See also ==
- Agoria
- Flanders in Action
- GIMV
- VOKA
- Walloon Export and Foreign Investment Agency (AWEX)

== Sources ==
- Official website
- Official website
