= Flemish Energy and Climate Agency =

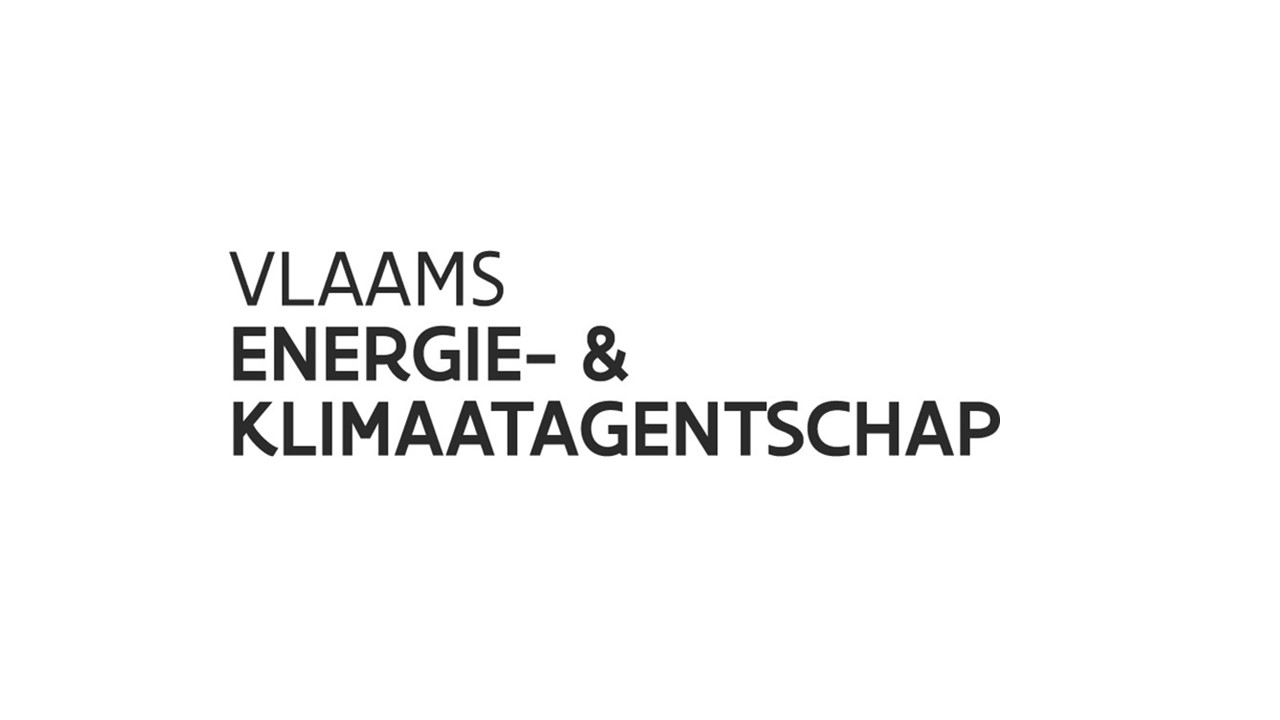

Flemish Energy and Climate Agency (Dutch: Vlaams Energie- en Klimaatagentschap; VEKA) is a government agency of the Flemish Region under the Flemish Ministry of Environment, tasked with the preparation and execution of Flemish energy policy and climate policy.

== Overview ==
The agency was originally created as the "Flemish Energy Agency" (Dutch: Vlaams Energieagentschap (VEA)) by a decision of the Flemish Government dated 16 April 2004 as part of the government reform project Beter Bestuurlijk Beleid. By a decision of the Flemish Government of 31 March 2006, the agency began operation 1 April 2006. It is led by an Administrator-General, who is appointed by the Flemish Government for a renewable six year term. Starting 1 January 2021 the agency was reformed and renamed by the Flemish Government into the Flemish Energy and Climate Agency.

The agency is made up out of the parts, responsible for energy, of the former Division of Natural Resources and Energy (ANRE) of the Flemish administration. It currently has some 180 employees.

The agency has its main office in Brussel and has offices in Gent and Hasselt. The agency employs a highly educated, technically trained staff, about two thirds of whom are engineers, legal and environmental protection specialists.

== Mission ==
The mission of VEKA is to prepare, stimulate, coordinate, implement, monitor and evaluate policy initiatives in the field of energy and greenhouse gas emissions that contribute to the transition to a climate-neutral and sustainable society in Flanders, whereby the policy instruments are used in a cost-efficient and high-quality manner, and the social and economic impact is taken into account.

According to Article 2.1.3 of the Energy Decree of 19 November 2010, VEKA has the following tasks:

1° substantiate and prepare, coordinate and implement, evaluate and report on the long-term visions on energy and climate, the Flemish Energy and Climate Plans and the Flemish energy and climate policy;
2° participate in the supra-regional decision-making process regarding energy and climate, through proactive participation in Belgian, European and international decision-making, implementation and reporting and, where possible within the available resources, in cross-border cooperation;
3° develop policy instruments and adequate solution-oriented measures packages for energy and climate policy and its efficient and effective implementation, including:

(a) promoting environmentally friendly energy production and managing the resources and funds intended for this purpose, including the preparation, implementation, monitoring and control of support for green electricity, cogeneration and green heat installations;
(b) promote the efficient and flexible use of energy, including storage, and manage the resources and funds dedicated to this purpose;

4° strive for the lowest possible energy system costs by using flexibility and regularly evaluating policy instruments;
5° prepare and apply the regulations relating to the efficient management and development of electricity, gas and heat distribution networks, and of the local electricity transport network;
6° systematically collect and use all data on energy (production, distribution, storage and consumption) and climate (greenhouse gas emissions) for policy preparation, studies, reporting and policy implementation through the development of data platforms;
7° substantiating energy and climate policy by, among other things, driving analyses, developing and monitoring policy indicators, developing and applying models and methodological tools, policy scenarios and forecasts;
8° manage and coordinate the use of the resources of the Flemish Climate Fund and the Energy Fund;
9° contribute to the optimal use of funds made available by the European and other supranational institutions;
10° building support for an energy-conscious and climate-neutral society, disseminating information and conducting and outsourcing awareness and communication actions about environmentally friendly energy production, efficient and flexible energy use and climate-conscious behavior;
11° structured collaboration and consultation with public and private stakeholders on energy and climate;
12° carry out or have carried out market research in the context of at least sustainable energy and climate policy, environmentally friendly energy production, efficient and flexible energy use, and social energy policy;
13° all other tasks, other than the tasks mentioned in points 1° to 12°, regarding energy and climate policy that have been and will be entrusted to the agency by or pursuant to a decree or by the Flemish Government.

The agency works closely with other Flemish agencies and administrations, as well as with the federal and local governments to develop new decrees and regulations and to enforce existing energy regulations. To enforce the compliance to energy regulations, the agency has the power to impose administrative sanctions, for instance fines, as punishment for non-compliance.

== See also ==
- Flemish institute for technological research (VITO)
- International Energy Agency
- SmartGrids
