= Service voucher =

A service voucher is a financial instrument which allows a public authority to target social services at those it deems in need, and at the same time to promote employment and labour market integration. It effectively boosts demand for certain services which meet social policy objectives.

A voucher scheme will typically start by defining services which are needed in society, but which are being supplied neither by the market nor by the public sector. These might include for example home care, household repairs, ironing, or bicycle hire and repair. The activities within the scheme will typically be agreed with trade unions and employers' organisations, to avoid concern about the disturbance of unfair competition.

Potential providers of these services are identified, often from among the long-term unemployed.

== Operations ==
Vouchers are sold to people who want to use the service. The price is subsidised, so that on the one hand the service is affordable - and for instance can compete with informal (illegal) work - and on the other provides decent condition working for the employees (including social insurance cover, holiday pay etc.).

An example of this kind of subsidy regime can be found in Belgium, where service vouchers for house cleaning, laundry, ironing, sewing, cooking, running errands, and transport for people with reduced mobility are sold to people who require these services. Each person residing in Belgium with a National Register Number is entitled to a quota of 500 service vouchers a year, with the first 400 service vouchers sold at a rate of 9 EUR each, and remaining 100 service vouchers sold at a rate of 10 EUR. In addition, each household has a quota of maximum 1000 service vouchers, with exceptions given to single parents and people with disabilities, who may be entitled to 2000 service vouchers, depending on the circumstances. Mothers with their own business who have just given birth are also entitled to 105 extra service vouchers.

This initiative was made in order to combat the black market and has resulted in the creation of many jobs. This subsidy scheme allows for domestic workers to be declared and benefit from a legal salary, health insurance, paid holidays, and a pension; benefits that were not all possible when working on the black market. For each service voucher, the company employing a domestic servant receives the amount of 23.02 EUR, paid by both the customer and the state. In addition, tax breaks are also given to the first 163 service vouchers purchased yearly, creating another incentive to purchase these services. Similar systems exists in France and in Sweden.

== Analysis of benefits ==
Vouchers can be defined as subsidies granting limited purchasing power to an individual to choose among a restricted set of services. In the field of personal and household services, their use has been growing in recent years, following successful experiences in some European countries. Vouchers can be seen as tools that would lie between in kind provision of services and cash distribution of income to be used (or not) for these services. Very basically, vouchers are simple means of payment. The payment can be integrally made by the user, or by a public financer, and mixed forms of payment with other actors can be imagined (e.g. companies paying for part of the cost or insurance companies providing some services through this means).

In the field of care policies, the increasing use of vouchers has sometimes been analysed as an element of a current commodification trend that corresponds to an increase in what can be labelled a “social market” logic. Social markets mainly rely on demand-side measures, the aim being to ensure that users or consumers of services are offered more choice and are, financially speaking, able to purchase personal services. The market logic involves developing the demand side with the aim of transforming “latent” demand into effective demand. These social markets thus involve competition between different modes of provision, with the user receiving direct or indirect assistance from public authorities to make their choice.

In the field of “non-care” services, vouchers are being used mostly for the same reasons as those in the care sector, that is for a series of supposed advantages in particular regarding efficiency of public spending, expected impact on undeclared labour but also quality issues (quality of services and quality of jobs).

1. A first advantage is freedom of choice. Under the logic of social markets, vouchers are supposed to allow for user choice between different types of providers (sometimes including public providers) or simply between providers of one single type (e.g. domestic workers).
2. A second advantage is efficiency. Vouchers offer less freedom of choice than pure money but their efficiency is linked to the fact that the demand is "channelled", i.e. that it is oriented towards certain types of services or activities; moreover there is an efficiency for public finances as if not used, the voucher does not represent a cost for authorities. As well it is possible to imagine public policies targeting people with special needs.
3. A third advantage is reduction of undeclared labour. Vouchers are meant to simplify the administrative procedures when employing someone to outsource housework tasks or care activities. In some cases, the purchase of a voucher does not entail the duty to sign a labour contract between the parties (as in France under specific conditions), which might have a negative impact on working conditions.
4. Further, social security contributions are calculated automatically and directly paid. Because they considerably reduce administrative burden, vouchers are supposed to be a significant incentive for the use of declared labour rather than undeclared labour.
5. Fifth, and finally, vouchers might foster quality of services. The partisans of the market-oriented and purchaser-provider model consider that it encourages innovation, flexibility and quality, as the market should eliminate the bad quality suppliers and encourage a user-oriented approach. As a Eurofound report notes: "The more actively involved service users are in determining the content of care, the more likely it is that care services will be greater suited to the individual’s values, culture, attitudes and circumstances. Empowerment of care recipients enables them to purchase their own care and have the security assurance of contractual rights. This can potentially influence the quality of care, as low standard care services would simply not be 'bought'. At the same time, care recipients could tailor a care programme to their specific needs, again raising quality and improving delivery." Voucher schemes could be steered in this direction, according to this report and to certain authors.
