= Pascal Smet =

Belgian politician

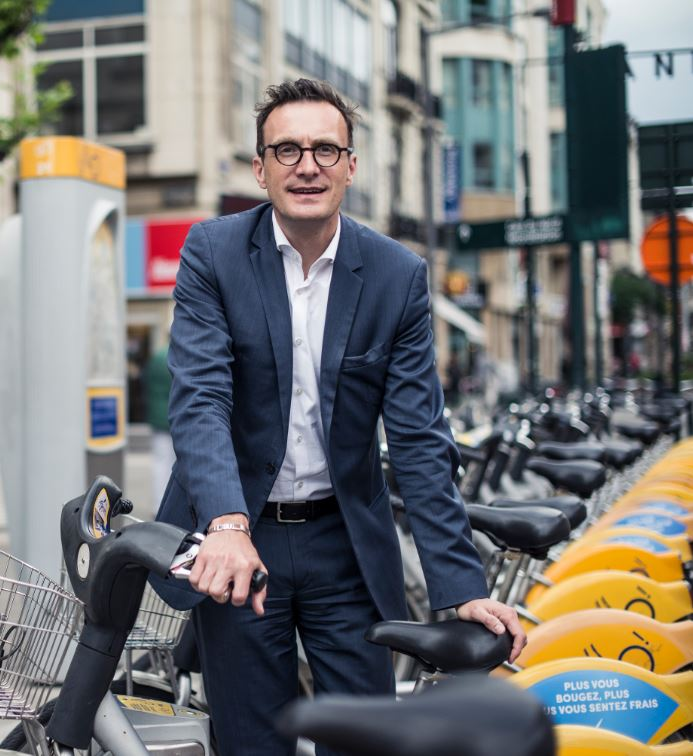

Brussels Minister of Mobility and Public Works

Personal details
- Born: 30 July 1967 (age 58) Haasdonk
- Occupation: politician

Pascal Smet (born 30 July 1967) is a Belgian politician, member of Vooruit.

== Personal life ==
He was born in 1967 in Beveren-Waas. He earned a degree in law at the University of Antwerp. He is openly gay.

== Career ==
He was a member of the town council of Beveren-Waas from 1989 to 1997 and a member of the province council of East Flanders (1991–1994).

He served as Belgium's Commissioner General for refugees and stateless people (2001–2003). In 2003 he became Secretary of State in the government of the Brussels-Capital Region with the competences of Mobility, the Civil Service, Fire Department, Urgent Medical Assistance and chairman of the Flemish Community Commission with the competences of Culture, Sport, the Civil Service and Media.

After the regional elections of 2004 Pascal Smet became a minister. From 2004 to 2009 he was minister in the government of the Brussels-Capital Region. He dealt with mobility and public works in the Brussels capital region. He was also competent for culture, sport and youth for the Flemish community in Brussels.
From 2006 to 2018, he was a member of the city council of the City of Brussels. Until 2012 he was also Schepen for Public Works, in name only, as the position was incompatible with his government functions.
After the 2009 regional elections, the SP.a was ousted from the Brussels government and on 13 July 2009 Smet became then a member of the Peeters II Government as Flemish Minister for Education, Youth, Equal Opportunities and Brussels Affairs.

In the 2014 regional elections he ran for the Brussels Parliament, after which he became Minister of Mobility and Public Works in the Brussels-Capital government again.
After the 2019 regional elections he became Secretary of State for Urbanism and Heritage, European and International Relations, Foreign Trade and Fire fighting and Emergency medical Assistance.

Pascal Smet has been lobbying for Uber.

On 18 June 2023 he resigned after sparking a furore by hosting an Iranian delegation led by Alireza Zakani. Ans Persoons replaced him.

== See also ==
- Uber Files
