= Kris Peeters =

Belgian politician

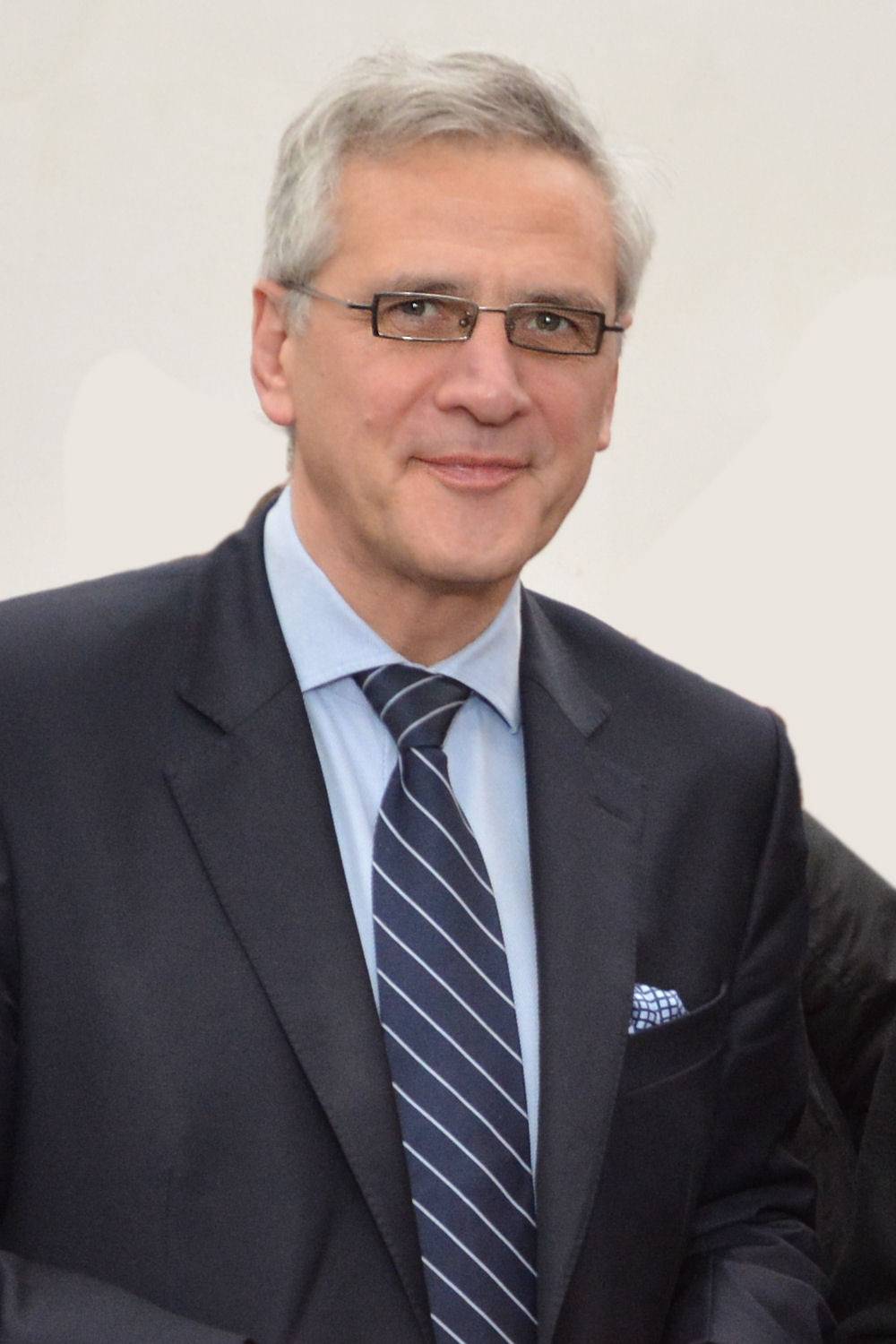

Member of the European Parliament
- In office 2 July 2019 – 11 January 2021
- Succeeded by: Tom Vandenkendelaere

Deputy Prime Minister
- In office 11 October 2014 – 1 July 2019
- Prime Minister: Charles Michel
- Preceded by: Pieter De Crem
- Succeeded by: Koen Geens

Minister of Employment, Economy, Consumer Affairs
- In office 11 October 2014 – 1 July 2019
- Prime Minister: Charles Michel
- Preceded by: Johan Vande Lanotte (Economy and Consumer Affairs); Monica De Coninck (Employment)
- Succeeded by: Wouter Beke

Minister-President of Flanders
- In office 28 June 2007 – 25 July 2014
- Preceded by: Yves Leterme
- Succeeded by: Geert Bourgeois

Personal details
- Born: 18 May 1962 (age 64) Reet, Belgium
- Party: CD&V
- Spouse: Ann
- Children: Karel
- Education: University of Antwerp, Vlerick Business School

Kris Peeters (Dutch: [ˈkrɪs ˈpeːtərs]; born 18 May 1962) is a Belgian politician of the Christian Democratic and Flemish party who served as vice-president of the European Investment Bank (EIB) from 2021 to 2024. Earlier in his career, he was Minister-President of Flanders (2007–2014), deputy prime minister and minister of economy and employment in the government of Prime Minister Charles Michel (2014–2019), and a Member of the European Parliament (2019–2021).

== Early life and education ==
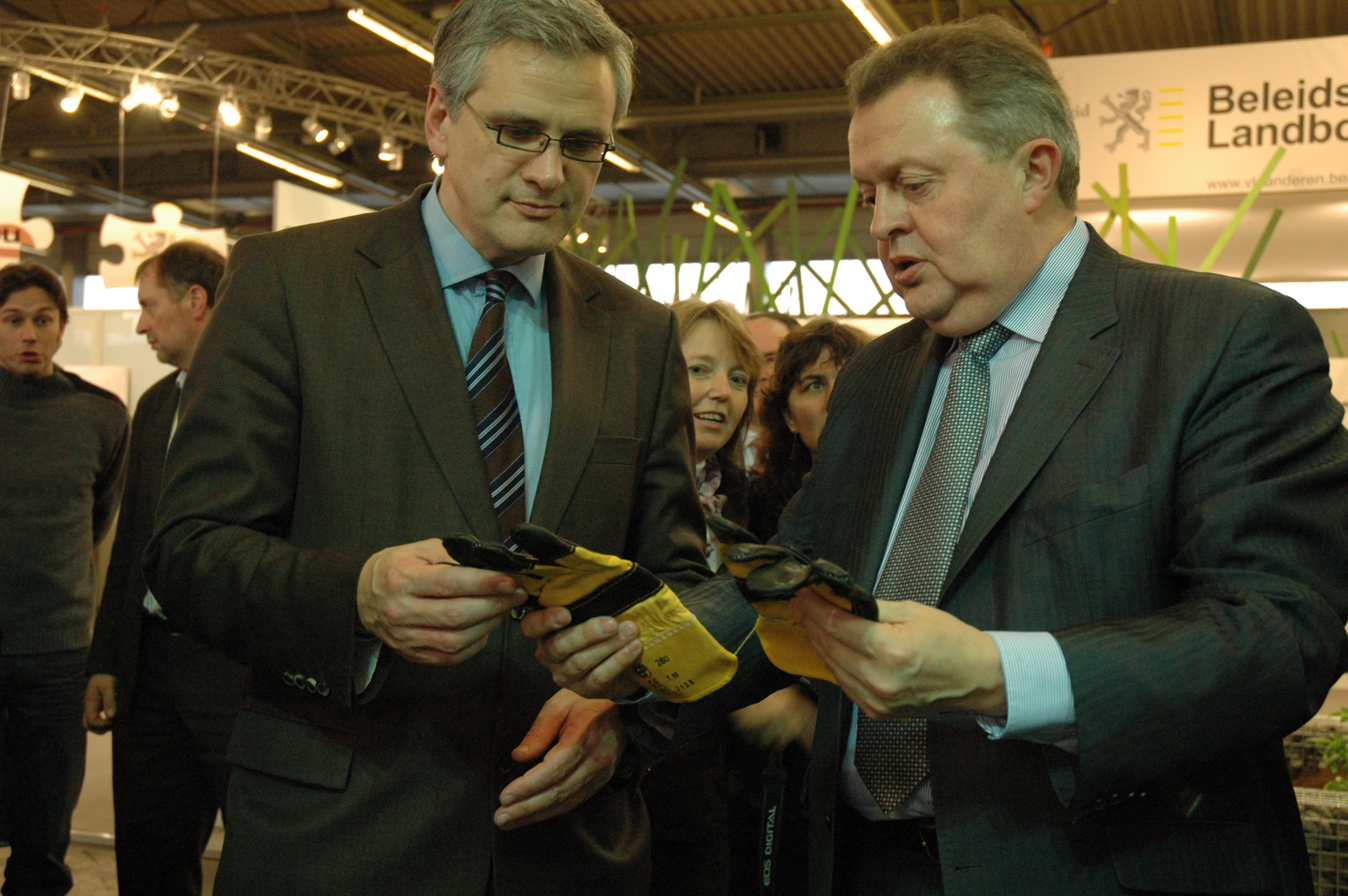
At the left, next to Piet Vanthemsche.

After attending secondary school in Boom, Peeters studied law in Antwerp and obtained a law degree in 1986. In addition, he obtained a degree in taxation and accounting from Vlerick Business School in Ghent.

== Early career ==
Peeters served from 1991 to 1994 as Director of the NCMV research department. In 1994, he became Secretary-General of NCMV and when NCMV was reformed into the SME interest group UNIZO in 1999, he became its first managing director.

== Political career ==
=== Career in national politics ===
In 2004, although not having been a candidate for public office at the 2004 regional elections, Peeters was asked to become a member of the Flemish Government. He resigned his position with UNIZO and became Flemish Minister for Public Works, Energy, the Environment and Nature.

During the 2006 municipal elections, Peeters ran for public office the first time in his career and was elected a member of the city council of his home town Puurs. In the 2007 Belgian federal elections, Peeters was elected to the Belgian Chamber of Representatives but chose not to take his seat, instead he succeeded Yves Leterme as Minister-President of Flanders, as Leterme headed the CD&V coalition talks for a new Belgian government. Peeters also gave up his former competences to Hilde Crevits and took on the responsibilities for Institutional Affairs, Agriculture and Sea Fisheries, formerly belonging to Leterme, while keeping his own competence regarding Ports. He has been serving a second term as head of the Flemish government since the regional elections of 7 June 2009, with the additional competences of Institutional Affairs, Economy, Agriculture and Sea Fisheries.

During the 2014 Belgian government formation Peeters was co-formateur along with Charles Michel (MR). Peeters was poised to become the new prime minister of Belgium. However, upon nominating Marianne Thyssen (also CD&V) as European Commissioner, his party already held a major political office. Consequently, Charles Michel became prime minister, and Kris Peeters became deputy prime minister and Minister of Employment, Economy and Consumer Affairs in the Michel Government.

Besides Bart De Wever, Maggie De Block and Theo Francken, Peeters is one of the most popular political figures in Flanders in recent years.

=== Member of the European Parliament, 2019–2021 ===
Peeters was a Member of the European Parliament from 2019 until 2021. During that time, he served on the Committee on the Internal Market and Consumer Protection and the Subcommittee on Security and Defence. In addition to his committee assignments, he chaired the Parliament's delegation for relations with the NATO Parliamentary Assembly.

== Later career ==
In late 2020, Peeters was nominated by the government of Prime Minister Alexander De Croo to become one of the vice-presidents of the European Investment Bank (EIB), representing the Benelux countries. In this capacity, he oversaw the Bank's activities on files such as mobility, security and defence, as well as operations in the ASEAN countries.

Political offices
Preceded by Yves Leterme	Minister-President of Flanders; 2007–2014	Succeeded by Geert Bourgeois
