= Gimv =

- Traded as: Euronext Brussels: GIMB
- ISIN: BE0003699130
- Industry: Private equity, venture capital
- Founded: 1980; 46 years ago
- Headquarters: Antwerp, Belgium
- Total assets: €1.8 billion
- Website: www.gimv.com

Gimv (Euronext Brussels: GIMB ) is a Belgian European investment company with experience in private equity and venture capital. Gimv is listed on Euronext Brussels and manages around 1.8 billion EUR invested in about 60 portfolio companies.

Gimv identifies entrepreneurial and innovative companies with high-growth potential. Gimv’s five investment platforms are: Connected Consumer, Life Sciences, Health & Care, Smart Industries and Sustainable Cities.

== See also ==
- Biotech Fund Flanders
- Flanders Institute of Biotechnology (VIB)
- Venture capital
