= Geert Bourgeois =

Belgian politician for the N-VA (born 1951)

Geert Bourgeois MEP
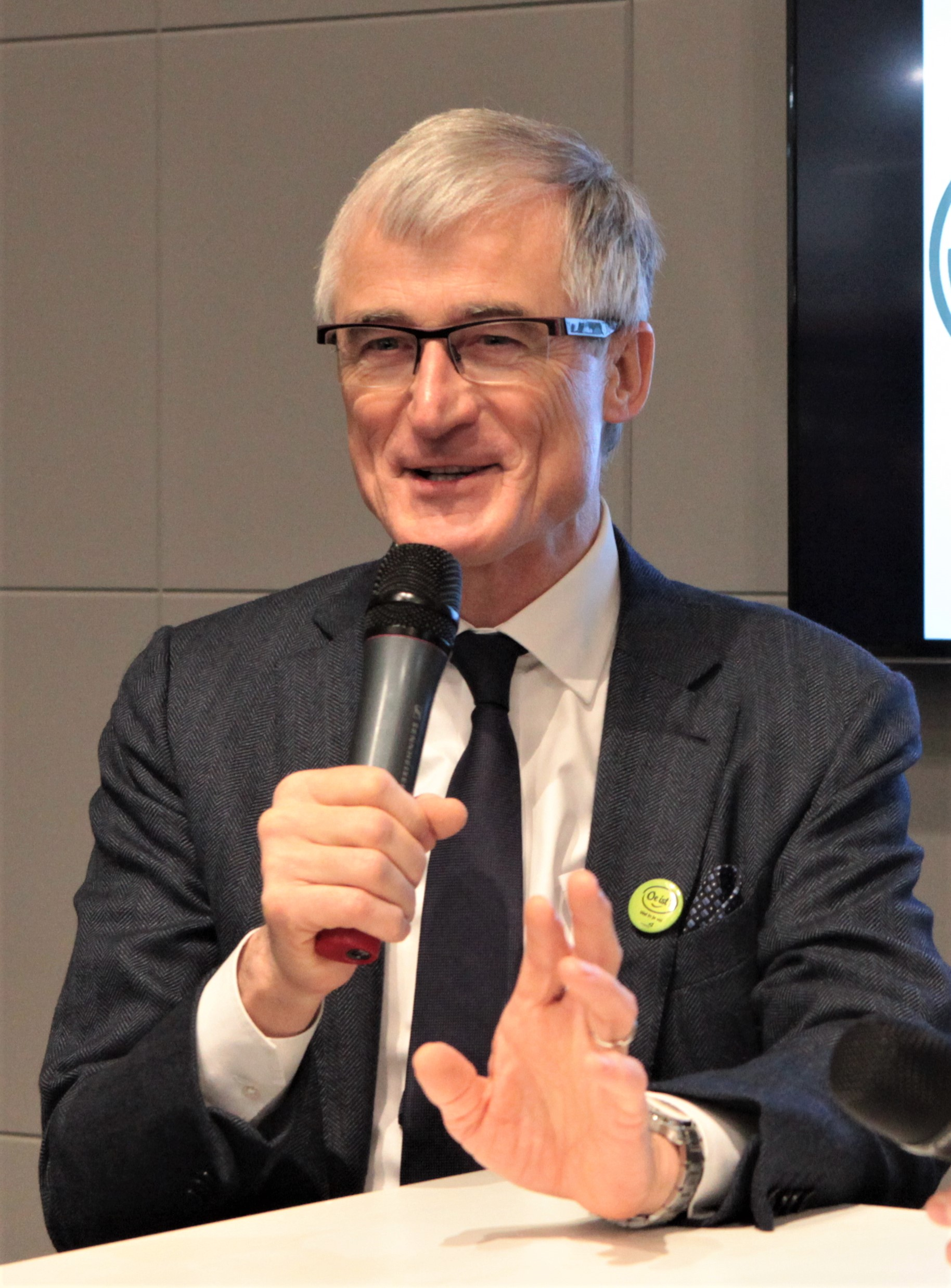
- Bourgeois in 2015

Member of the European Parliament for Belgium
- In office 2 July 2019 – 15 July 2024
- Constituency: Dutch-speaking electoral college

Minister-President of Flanders
- In office 25 July 2014 – 2 July 2019
- Preceded by: Kris Peeters
- Succeeded by: Liesbeth Homans

Member of the Chamber of Representatives
- In office 5 July 2010 – 7 July 2010
- Constituency: West Flanders
- In office 8 June 1995 – 22 July 2004
- Constituency: Kortrijk-Roeselare-Tielt (1995–2003); West Flanders (2003–2004)

Personal details
- Born: 6 July 1951 (age 75) Roeselare, Belgium
- Party: New Flemish Alliance (since 2001)
- Other political affiliations: People's Union (1976–2001)
- Spouse: Betty Hoste
- Children: 2
- Education: Ghent University

Geert Albert Bourgeois (Dutch pronunciation: [ˈɣeːrd buːrˈʑʋaː]; (Note: Geert in isolation: [ɣeːrt].) born 6 July 1951) is a Belgian politician of the New Flemish Alliance (N-VA), which he founded in 2001, who is currently serving as a Member of the European Parliament since 2019. He previously served as the Minister-President of Flanders from 2014 to 2019. Prior to this, he was a member of the federal Chamber of Representatives for the People's Union from 1995 to 2001, and then for the N-VA from 2001 to 2004. He has been involved in local and regional politics in Flanders since 1976.

== Biography ==
Geert Bourgeois's father, Emiel Bourgeois, was born in Hulste on 10 October 1918, towards the end of the First World War. He went on to work as a primary school teacher. After the Second World War he was accused of collaboration and spent some time in prison. He was subsequently rehabilitated and appointed headmaster at the primary school where he had previously been teaching. He died in 1998. Emiel Bourgeois married Izegem-born Gaby Vens (1920–2015), with whom he had two sons and two daughters. Geert Bourgeois attended secondary school at Saint Joseph's College in Izegem before he went on to read law at Ghent University from 1970 to 1975. That same year, he married Betty Hoste with whom he set up a law firm. The couple have two sons. Bourgeois was politically engaged from an early age. During his time at secondary school, he became a member of the Catholic Student Action (Katholieke Studentenactie – KSA). In 1966, he set up, along with his brother Kris and his classmate Koen Baert, a Blue Banner group of Father Boucquillon. When the group later merged with the VNJ (Flemish Nationalist Youth League), he left the local chapter. He later became involved with the Flemish Nationalist Student Union (Vlaams-Nationale Studentenunie) and the Language Action Committee (Taal Aktie Komitee). At the age of 17, he became the secretary of the local Volksunie branch and the chairman of the Volksunie Youth Wing of Izegem.

== Political career ==
=== Local politics ===
Bourgeois took part in the municipal council elections for the first time in 1976. He was elected into office with 997 preferential votes. As he still had to comply with his national service obligations, he was unable to take up his seat until 1977. In 1982, he was re-elected, with the Volksunie joining the city council. Bourgeois served as Alderman for Public Works, Town and Country Planning, Town Centre Regeneration, Trade, Small Business Owners & Industry and Legal Affairs. He has consistently been re-elected ever since. After the 1988 elections, he again became Alderman in the municipal council, an office he held until 1994. The 1994 elections put a different majority coalition in power in Izegem. He continued to sit as a member of the Izegem municipal council until 2018, and did not stand again in the municipal council elections held that same year. From 2013 until 2018, he chaired the Izegem municipal council.

=== National politics ===
From 1977 onwards, Geert Bourgeois ran in all national elections. He joined the national board of the Volksunie party, and from 1990 until 1993, served as chairman of the Association of Flemish (political) Office Holders. In 1996, he joined the Volksunie party leadership. In the 1995 elections, he was elected as a member of the federal parliament. In the federal Chamber of Representatives, he primarily focused on legal affairs and matters concerning Belgium's different Communities. Even though he served as a member of the opposition, he managed to get several private member's bills of his adopted, such as the Protection of Sources Act, which means that reporters are now only required to reveal the identity of their sources in the event of an emergency. He gained nationwide acclaim for his activities as a member of the Dutroux Committee and the role he played in the Octopus negotiations. In 1999, Bourgeois became leader of the Volksunie political group in the Chamber of Representatives.

The following year he was elected general party chairman by the membership of what was then the Volksunie, which saw sitting party chairman Patrik Vankrunkelsven ousted. This election sparked a series of conflicts between the party chairman, who had been directly elected by the members, and the VU's party board, appointed by the party leadership. The differences in opinion came to a head at the time of the Lambermont Agreement. Bourgeois was not prepared to back this agreement, in spite of the fact that it had been approved by the Volksunie's party board. As such, he did not approve it, thus acting contrary to the relevant instructions of the competent bodies within the party. Headed up by then Minister Bert Anciaux, the party board got behind the agreement, in response to which Bourgeois stepped down as party chairman. Around this time, Geert Bourgeois put together the so-called "Oranjehofgroep" (which would go on to become the bedrock of the N-VA) along with people such as Frieda Brepoels, Eric Defoort, Ben Weyts and Bart De Wever. The Oranjehofgroup was a group of Flemish nationalist Volksunie members who opposed the direction in which the party was being taken by Anciaux. The group derived its name from a Ghent hospitality business where the members would meet. The antagonisms between Bourgeois' Flemish Nationalist wing which wanted the VU to pursue a conservative, independent Flemish Nationalist direction, and the wing helmed by Bert Anciaux, who was looking to merge the Volksunie with its progressive programme with another political party, eventually resulted in the break-up of the VU.

In a referendum for the general membership, the Bourgeois group, with just under 50% of the votes cast, came out victorious against the two other groups participating, headed up by Bert Anciaux and Johan Sauwens respectively. Since at least 50% of the votes had to be gained to earn the right to continue under the Volksunie name, Bourgeois and his supporters set up a new party in November 2001: the New Flemish Alliance (Nieuw-Vlaamse Alliantie N-VA). From 2001 until 2004, Bourgeois served as the first party chairman of the N-VA which engaged in fierce opposition against the "purple" coalition government. In his book entitled De puinhoop van Paars-groen (The Shambles of Purple-Green), he heaped scathing criticism on the Belgian government that had been in power from 1999 to 2002. The title of the book was a reference to Pim Fortuyn's De puinhopen van acht jaar Paars which criticized the Dutch purple coalitions. In May 2003, Bourgeois was re-elected into the federal Chamber of Representatives as the only N-VA candidate; he held his seat until 2004. In the third direct Flemish elections held on 13 June 2004, he was elected in the electoral constituency of West Flanders. He remained a Member of the Flemish Parliament for over one month until he joined the Government of Flanders on 22 July 2004; he was succeeded as Member of the Flemish Parliament by Jan Loones.

He was succeeded as N-VA party chairman by Bart De Wever when he took up office in July 2004 as Flemish Minister for Public Governance, Foreign Policy, Media and Tourism in the Leterme I Government. On 22 September 2008, he tendered his resignation as a serving Minister in the Government of Flanders, in the wake of which the cartel with CD&V – of which Bourgeois has been one of the architects – was ended. Bourgeois subsequently resumed his seat as Member of the Flemish Parliament until June 2009. From the very outset, he went into opposition mode against the government he had just left. This was contrary to the tradition that former Ministers should remain absent for a while after they have stood down.

In the Flemish elections of 7 June 2009, Geert Bourgeois was again directly elected in the electoral constituency of West Flanders. One month later, on 13 July 2009, Bourgeois was appointed Vice-Minister–President and Minister in the Peeters II Government. He was in charge of Public Governance, Local and Provincial Government, Civic Integration, Tourism and the Vlaamse Rand. By decision of the Government of Flanders of 24 July 2009, he was also assigned the competence 'Immovable Heritage'. He passed on his tenure as a Member of the Flemish Parliament to Wilfried Vandaele.

In June 2010, he ran in the federal elections as the leading candidate for the province of West Flanders. He was elected as a Member of Parliament. However, in order to be sworn in as a Member of Parliament, he had to temporarily step down as a Flemish Minister. This occurred on 5 July 2010. Two days later, he was re-appointed Minister and resigned from the Chamber of Representatives. In the wake of the Flemish elections of 25 May 2014, he was sworn in as a Member of the Flemish Parliament at the inaugural meeting of the Flemish Parliament on 17 June 2014. On 25 July 2014, he was sworn in as the Minister-President of Flanders. His seat as a Member of the Flemish Parliament was taken by his successor Bert Maertens. On 2 December 2015, a formal tribute was paid to Geert Bourgeois in the Flemish Parliament's plenary assembly for having served 20 years as either a Member of Parliament or a Minister. Ahead of the 2019 Flemish regional elections, it was announced that Bourgeois would not be a candidate for a second term as Minister-President, and would instead lead the N-VA's list in the European parliamentary elections taking place on the same day.

=== European Parliament ===
He was elected as a Member of the European Parliament in the 2019 European Parliament election on 26 May 2019. On 2 July 2019, Bourgeois resigned as Flemish minister-president in order to assume his new mandate as an MEP. He was succeeded in this role by fellow party-member Liesbeth Homans, who became the first female minister-president of Flanders. Along with the other N-VA MEPs, he joined the ECR group in the European Parliament, despite tensions between the N-VA and the Spanish far-right party Vox over the Catalan independence movement.

== Summary of participation in political elections ==
- Flemish Parliament 13 June 1999 – 3rd successor electoral constituency of Kortrijk-Roeselare-Tielt – VU-ID
- Senate 18 May 2003 – 1st place Dutch-speaking electoral college – N-VA – not elected
- Chamber of Representatives 18 May 2003 – 1st place electoral constituency of West Flanders – N-VA – elected – serves until 13 June 2004
- Flemish Parliament 13 June 2004 – 2nd place electoral constituency of West Flanders – CD&V-N-VA – elected – Flemish Minister
- European Parliament 13 June 2004 – 14th place electoral constituency of Flanders – CD&V-N-VA – elected – decides not to take up his seat (He was replaced by Frieda Brepoels.)
- Municipal Council 8 October 2006 – Izegem – 1st place – N-VA – elected
- Chamber of Representatives 10 June 2007 – 16th place West Flanders – CD&V-N-VA – not elected
- European Parliament 7 June 2009 – 12th place electoral constituency of Flanders – N-VA – not elected
- Flemish Parliament 7 June 2009 – 1st place electoral constituency of West Flanders – N-VA – elected – Flemish Minister
- Chamber of Representatives 13 June 2010 – 1st place electoral constituency of West Flanders – N-VA – elected (45,848 preferential votes) (On 2 July 2010 it was announced that he would briefly resign from the Government of Flanders in order to formally take the oath at the Chamber of Representatives. He subsequently immediately arranged to have himself replaced in the Chamber before being sworn in again as a Flemish Minister. In the Chamber, he was succeeded by Bert Maertens who obtained 8,083 preferential votes.).
- Local elections (municipal and provincial council elections) of 2012
- Flemish elections of 25 May 2014 (coinciding with the federal and European elections).

== Orders and decorations ==
- 2016: Japanese Order of the Rising Sun, 3rd Class, 2016.

== See also ==
- List of foreign ministers in 2017
- List of current foreign ministers

== Notes ==
Political offices
Preceded by Kris Peeters	Minister-President of Flanders; 2014–2019	Succeeded by Liesbeth Homans
