= Joke Schauvliege =

Belgian politician

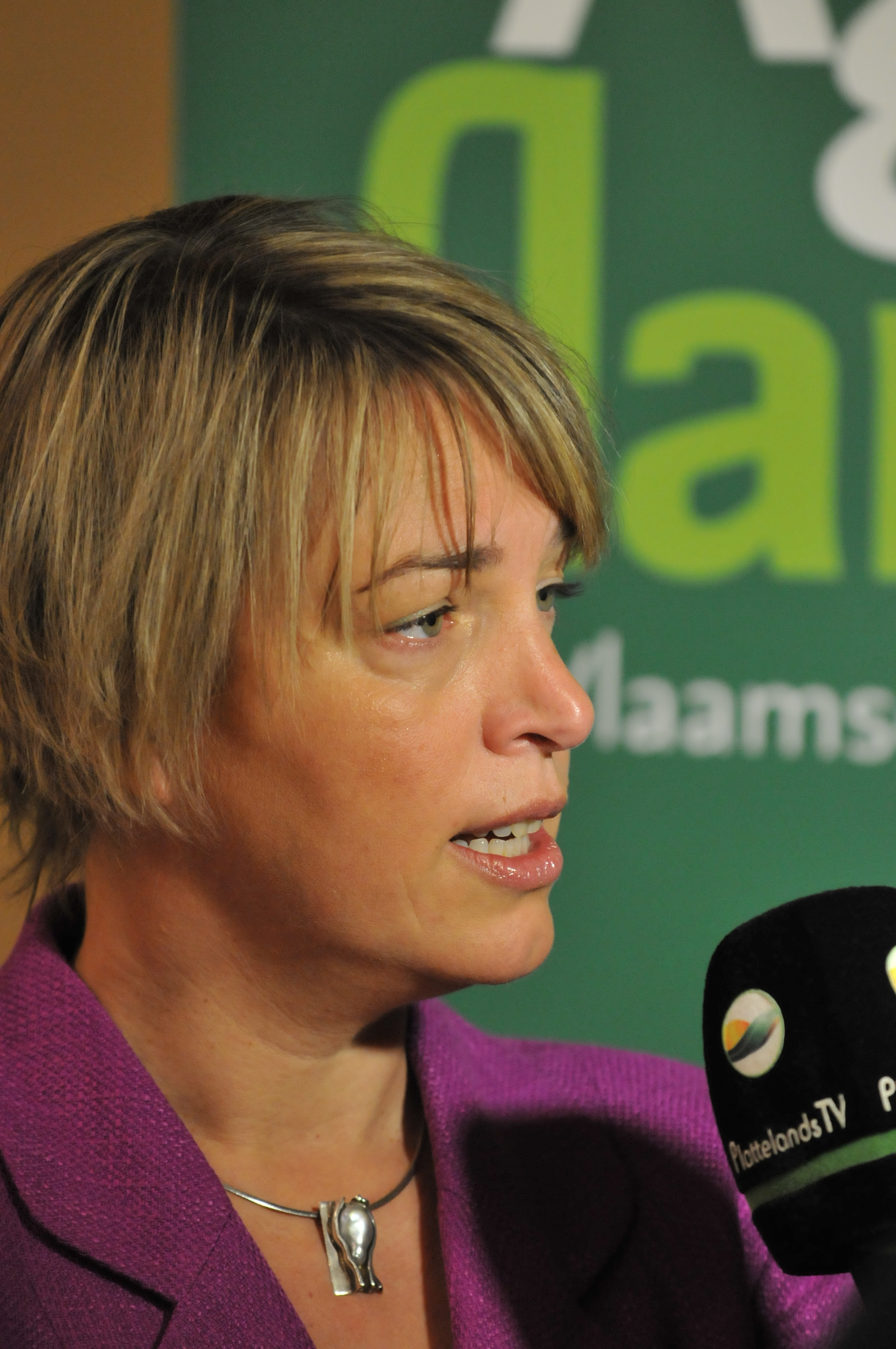

Flemish Minister
- In office 28 June 2007 – 5 February 2019

Personal details
- Born: 16 March 1970 (age 56) Ghent, Belgium
- Party: CD&V

Joke Schauvliege (born in Ghent on 16 March 1970) is a Belgian politician from Flanders.

== Career ==
She has been schepen (municipal officer) of Planning, Youth, Tourism and Environmental Development in the municipality of Evergem since 2 January 2007. She has been the national vice-president of the Christian Democratic and Flemish party since 2008.

During the 2009 Flemish elections, she won the highest number of preference votes in the province of East Flanders. In July 2009, she took office as Minister for Environment, Nature and Culture in the Flemish Cabinet (Peeters II). Several artists found it unacceptable that she became Minister for Culture after she ignited controversy by saying she had little affinity with the cultural sector.

After the Flemish elections in 2014, she became minister for Town and Country Planning, Environment, Nature and Agriculture.

At a climate demonstration in Brussels on 27 January 2019 attended by 75,000 people, Schauvliege specifically, and politicians in general, received a lot of criticism from young people. A few days later, in a speech to the General Farmers Syndicate on 2 February 2019, she described this and other demonstrations as a "set up game" and claimed that the state security agency had informed her about the instigators of the protests. She later retracted her claim, but following internal party consultations resigned as minister on 5 February 2019.

== Honours ==
- 2014: commander in the Order of Leopold.
