= Philippe Muyters =

Belgian politician

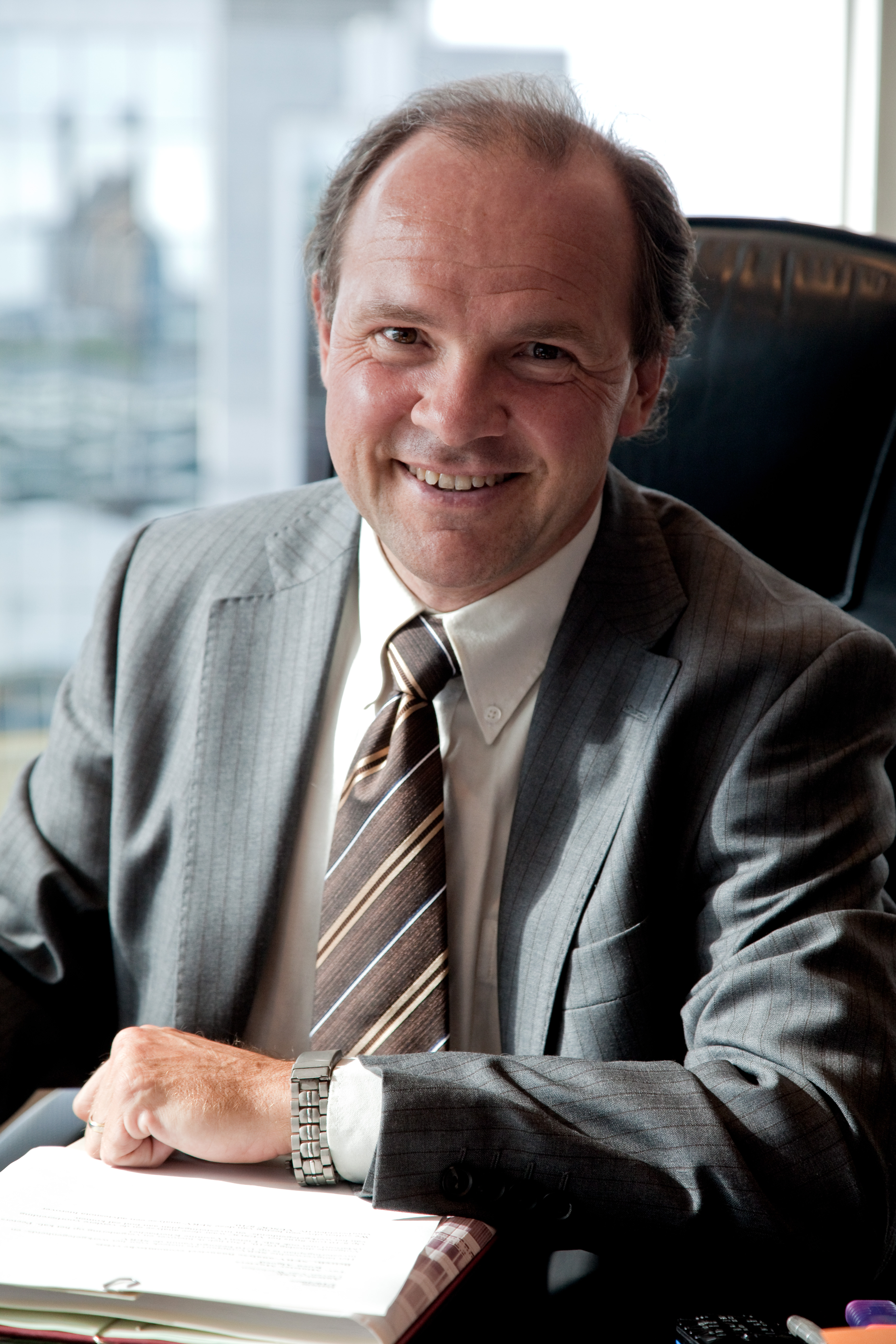

Flemish Minister

Personal details
- Born: 6 December 1961 (age 64) Antwerp
- Party: N-VA
- Occupation: politician

Philippe Muyters (born 6 December 1961) is a Belgian politician from the Flemish Region and is a member of the New Flemish Alliance (N-VA).

== Biography ==
Muyters was born in Antwerp. He is of Spanish descent on his mother's side and Belgian descent on his father's. He is the brother of Serge Muyters who served as chief of police in Antwerp. Muyters studied at the Sint-Jan Berchmanscollege in Antwerp and obtained a master's degree in Applied Economics from the University of Antwerp in 1984. From 2000 until 2009 he was the Managing Director of VOKA (Flemish Chamber of Commerce and Industry). In 2009 he joined the Flemish Government, where he is the Flemish Minister for Finance, Budget, Work, Town and Country Planning and Sports. After the general elections of 2010, he was elected as a Senator. Therefore, he resigned as Flemish Minister for one day, to take the oath as Senator and immediately be succeeded to take the oath again as Flemish Minister.
