= COVID-19 pandemic in Belgium =

Aspect of viral disease pandemic

- Disease: COVID-19
- Pathogen: SARS-CoV-2
- Location: Belgium
- First outbreak: Wuhan, Hubei, China
- Index case: Brussels
- Arrival date: 3 February 2020 (6 years, 8 months, 3 weeks and 2 days ago)
- Confirmed cases: 4,908,511 (Note: The actual number of infections is estimated to be much higher than the number of cases confirmed by a laboratory test.)
- Recovered: 4,736,144
- Deaths: 34,339 (Note: The total number of death cases in Belgium also includes suspected death cases, including those in foster and care homes, where only 26% of the reported death cases have been confirmed as COVID-19 positive. In many other countries, the reported deaths following a COVID-19 infection are only accounted for when they occur in hospital. This is an important note for comparison purposes.)
- Fatality rate: 0.7%
- Vaccinations: 8,697,961

Government website
- www.info-coronavirus.be

The COVID-19 pandemic in Belgium has resulted in 4,908,511 confirmed cases of COVID-19 and 34,339 deaths.

The virus was confirmed to have spread to Belgium on 4 February 2020, when one of a group of nine Belgians repatriated from Wuhan to Brussels was reported to have tested positive for the coronavirus. Transmission within Belgium was confirmed in early March; authorities linked this to holidaymakers returning from Northern Italy at the end of the half-term holidays. The epidemic increased rapidly in March–April 2020. By the end of March all 10 provinces of the country had registered cases.

By March 2021, Belgium had the third highest number of COVID-19 deaths per head of population in the world, according to data compiled by Johns Hopkins University. However, Belgium may have been over-reporting the number of cases, with health officials reporting that suspected cases were being reported along with confirmed cases. Unlike some countries that publish figures based primarily on confirmed hospital deaths, the death figures reported by the Belgian authorities included deaths in the community, such as in care homes, confirmed to have been caused by the virus, as well as a much larger number of such deaths suspected to have been caused by the virus, even if the person was not tested.

== Background ==
On 12 January 2020, the World Health Organization (WHO) confirmed that a novel coronavirus was the cause of a respiratory illness in a cluster of people in Wuhan, Hubei, China, which was reported to the WHO on 31 December 2019. First reports of COVID-19 started to appear in the Belgian media around 8 January.

The case fatality ratio for COVID-19 has been much lower than SARS of 2003, but the transmission has been significantly greater, with a significant total death toll. (see statistics below)

== Timeline ==
=== February 2020 – first case ===
On 2 February, nine Belgian nationals living in Hubei were repatriated on an evacuation flight landing at Melsbroek Air Base close to Brussels before being transferred to the Military Hospital of Neder-Over-Heembeek, where they underwent a 14-day quarantine and were tested for infection with the virus. On 4 February, it was announced that one of the repatriated had tested positive for the novel coronavirus, the first case in Belgium. The patient, an asymptomatic 54-year-old male, was then transferred to St. Peter's Hospital in Brussels, one of the two referral centres in the country.

On 21 February, a group of ten Belgian citizens were allowed to return to Belgium after having been constrained on the MS Westerdam cruise ship for several days.

On 24 February, following the spread of COVID-19 in northern Italy, 100 Belgian citizens were put in quarantine in the H10 Costa Adeje Palace in Tenerife that was put on lockdown. Fifteen of them were allowed to travel back to Belgium on 28 February and the remainder on 5 March, without having been tested for the coronavirus upon arrival.

=== March 2020 – spread ===
On 1 March, a second case was confirmed in Belgium, a Dutch-speaking woman who had returned from Crépy-en-Valois in one of the regions affected in France.

The yearly one week school holiday around carnival lasted from 22 February until 1 March 2020. Many people go on ski vacation during that period, and the number of detected virus infections rose sharply upon the return of people from holidays in affected areas.

On 2 March, six additional cases, making a total of eight, had been diagnosed. Five were found in Flanders and one in Brussels, all six infected people having come back from Northern Italy.

As of 3 March, six further cases were confirmed, making a total of 14 cases. Amongst the new cases, a 17-year from Tienen and one person from Sint-Niklaas returned from a ski vacation in northern Italy, a person from Verviers, two cases from Couthuin and a 65-year-old male from Eupen who presented relatively severe symptoms and had not been to any of the regions with a higher risk of infection. Steven Van Gucht of the Scientific Committee predicted that in the worst-case scenario the epidemic would cause 13,000 virus infections, with 2,000 to 3,000 hospitalisations and 500 to 700 patients in intensive care. In a later interview van Gucht refined his opinion, adding that 70% of the population (approximately 8 million persons) could become infected.

By 4 March 10 new cases were confirmed, making a total of 23. Nine of the new infected individuals had recently returned from Italy. The other patient had had contact with a prior case. Four cases were in the Leuven area, one case in Hasselt, and one in Pelt. In Wevelgem, a family and a primary school teacher were diagnosed with the coronavirus upon their return from the North of Italy. The Flemish Agency for Care and Health advised the school not to close down. A retirement home in Gooik stopped receiving visitors after discovering that one of its employees could have been in contact with the coronavirus, a precaution the Flemish Agency for Care and Health qualified as inappropriate and "excessive".

On 4 March, the European Defence Agency (EDA) confirmed that a staff member had tested positive for coronavirus, marking the first confirmed case in the agencies of the European Union. He had returned from Italy the previous week and attended a meeting with about thirty other European Union officials before he had started to feel ill. A military staff member of the European External Action Service who attended the meeting then also began to experience symptoms. The EDA cancelled all meetings until 13 March, and other EU institutions also took precautions.

On 5 March 27 new confirmed cases were reported by the government (16 in Flanders, nine in Wallonia and two in Brussels), bringing the total to 50. Of the 50 people then infected one had recovered, 48 were quarantined in their homes and one person was being treated in the Sint-Pietersziekenhuis. The new cases were reported to be in Knokke-Heist, Zonhoven, Doomkerke (Ruiselede) and Vlierzele (part of Sint-Lievens-Houtem).

On 6 March 59 new cases were reported by the government, bringing the total to 109 (65 in Flanders, 12 in Brussels, 31 in Wallonia and one recovered). The new cases were amongst others reported in Oosterzele and Sint-Katelijne-Waver. The Federal Public Service Health then confirmed for the first time that infections had occurred in Belgium.

On 7 March 60 new cases were confirmed by the government (40 in Flanders, five in Brussels and 15 in Wallonia), bringing the total to 169 (105 in Flanders, 17 in Brussels, 46 in Wallonia and one recovered). The new cases were amongst others reported in Houthalen, Melle, Lokeren, Mere, Lede, Tildonk and Poppel. The Federal Public Service Health mentioned generally that "more and more infections are being contracted locally" but did not provide information on how many.

From 422 samples analysed on 7 March 31 were reported positive on 8 March (16 in Flanders, eight in Brussels and seven in Wallonia), bringing the number of infections to 200. The Federal Public Service Health then reported local circulation of the virus in different parts of the country.

On 10 March, the total number of confirmed cases was 267.

On 11 March, the first death on Belgian territory due to COVID-19 was reported, of a 90-year-old female patient from Brussels who was being treated in Etterbeek. Two more patients died on the same day, one aged 73, and one of 86 who died in Sint-Genesius-Rode.

On 12 March, two new infections were detected as well as 32 suspected cases in retirement home Ter Kameren in Watermael-Boitsfort, one of the biggest retirement homes of the Brussels region. The total number of confirmed cases rose to 399. Approximately 20 patients out of those 399 were being treated in intensive care. The president of the European Commission, Ursula von der Leyen informed the entire staff that seven of their colleagues had tested positive, six of them in Belgium. She also instructed "all colleagues in non-critical functions" to work from home with immediate effect until 5 April, while those "who ensure critical functions" would need to work in two shifts to minimize the risk of contagion.

By 14 March 689 cases were confirmed with four deaths.

On 21 March it was observed that more than half of the patients in the hospital Oost-Limburg in Genk were of Turkish origin. Secretary of State Zuhal Demir urged the Turkish community in Limburg to abide by the quarantine measures.

On 26 March, Sciensano published a map that showed that the highest recorded concentrations of infections were found in Alken and Sint-Truiden (Limburg) and Quévy and Honnelles (Hainaut). The hotspot in Alken is thought to have been caused because of two parties that were allowed to gather over the weekend of 7 March. The mayor of Sint-Truiden, who was herself infected by the new coronavirus, mentioned she did not understand the reason for the high incidence in her town. The high level of cases in the affluent municipality of Bonheiden is thought to be linked with the number of travellers who had returned from ski resorts in the North of Italy around the beginning of March. While the high incidence in Honnelles could be linked to an outbreak in a centre for disabled people, the mayor of Quévy had no idea what caused the large outbreak in her municipality but complained of the lack of communication and protective equipment.

On the daily press conference of 27 March Van Gucht announced that a cat had been infected by its owner. This was only the third time the infection of a companion animal by its human companion had been reported worldwide. The cat had developed respiratory and digestive problems.

The additional number of people reported as having tested positive for the novel coronavirus peaked on 28 March compared to the previous days. The peak occurred because more persons were being tested and because a major Walloon laboratory that had not reported any cases up to that point then belatedly reported 500 additional cases from a past period.

As of 29 March, around 20,000 Belgian citizens were stuck abroad due to travel restrictions worldwide, many in Peru, South Africa, Australia and New Zealand.

On 30 March, it was announced that because of the high burden on some hospitals in the provinces of Limburg and Hainaut, a dispersal plan for ICU patients had been activated.

Jan Eyckmans of the Federal Public Service Health claimed hospitals increased their number of ICUs from 1900 to 2650 over a period of two weeks time, corresponding to an increase from 16.5 to 23.0 ICUs per 100,000 inhabitants. However, on the daily press conference of the Belgian National Crisis Centre of 28 March Dr Emmanuel André of the UZ Leuven mentioned that the number of 789 ICUs corresponded to 43% of the capacity, bringing the total capacity to 1835 instead of 2650, while Dr Van Gucht quoted the capacity as 2081 units. The newspaper De Standaard mentioned the number of 1765 on 31 March and 2393 on 3 April.

=== April 2020 – first peak ===
At the end of March, it became clear that the peak of the only wave thus far of the pandemic within the country was expected in early April. On 8 April, a drop in the number of active hospitalisations could be seen, which meant that a peak in them, and thus perhaps in infections, had been reached a couple days earlier. The mortality peak would follow a bit later, and was retrospectively observed to have occurred on 12 April. The peak was 417 deaths in 24 hours.

On 1 June Belgium's Prince Joachim issued a public apology following news that he tested positive for COVID-19 after he attended a party in Spain, in violation of the country's lockdown.

=== May 2020 ===
Starting 4 May 2020, Belgium began gradually to ease the lockdown measures, which were the measures taken from 18 March to combat the spread of the coronavirus. For example, as of 11 May, all shops are allowed to be open for the public but under certain conditions (e.g. visits are limited to 30 minutes). Cafes and restaurants were allowed to be open as of 8 June.

=== June 2020 ===
In June, 10,000 people demonstrated in Brussels, in the Black Lives Matter demonstration, with corona measures still in place. It was strongly disapproved by Minister President of Flanders Jan Jambon who called it detrimental to the spread of the virus.

=== July 2020 ===
21 July, three Chiro Flanders youth camps were canceled in West Flanders and Antwerp because 11 leaders were found to be infected.

On 25 July new regulations made it compulsory to wear face coverings in most indoor spaces and busy outdoor spaces. Visitors to a pub have to wear face coverings at least until they have found a seat. Those breaking the rules could be fined up to 250 Euros.

On 27 July, the government published new social distancing rules to come into effect in Belgium from 29 July, whereby the number of closer contacts of separate households was restricted to a group of maximum 5 people (the so-called "bubble of five"). With people who are not part of your bubble, safety distance had to be respected. People could only go to a restaurant within their family and within the bubble.

On 28 July, in response to a flare-up in Antwerp, measures are being tightened locally. E.g. a curfew is being imposed for the entire province. Individuals are required to stay in their homes from 11.30 pm to 6 am. It lasted 1 month.

=== August to September 2020 – resurgence ===
As from the end of July and during August and September, the number of new corona infections per day began to rise again in Belgium. Mid September, an average of 1,100 new infections per day were counted. Belgium had then passed the milestone of 100,000 confirmed coronavirus infections. The number of testing was now much increased. In September an average of more than 30,000 tests were carried out daily compared to ca. 5,000 tests daily begin April. The increased number of tests could partially but not fully explain the increasing number of infections. The percentage of positive COVID-19 cases of all samples taken has risen in September to more than 3%. It was more than 5% at the peak in April and less than 1% at the end of June. Nevertheless, the number of hospitalised coronavirus patients had continued to remain at a low level. On 18 September, a total of 260 patients were receiving hospital care due to COVID-19, compared to almost 7,000 at the peak of the epidemic. Belgian virologist Marc Van Ranst advocated against easing and in favour of stricter measures, calling the situation in Belgium on 15 September a recipe for disaster. Other experts reacted in the media and questioned whether the situation had to be seen as alarming.

On 17 September, at least 77 youngsters from West Flanders tested positive for COVID-19 after a holiday in the Portuguese resort of Albufeira.

On 24 September, new coronavirus restrictions were announced by the government. The restrictions were eased on some points. The rule of the bubble of 5 was changed: each person in a household could have closer contact with up to 5 persons, with different persons each month.

=== October 2020 to April 2021 – return to lockdown ===
The average number of daily new infections had risen to 1,440 by the beginning of October. The situation in Belgium was in line with that of other countries in the EU.

New data on 30 October showed that Belgium had the highest infection rate in Europe. The new Prime Minister, Alexander De Croo therefore announced that a national lockdown would be reintroduced from 2 November onward. Non-essential shops were to close, households were only allowed one visitor at a time and school holidays were extended to 15 November. Mr De Croo said that the restrictions would remain in place until at least mid-December.

In mid-October 2020, 26 people working at the Doel Nuclear Power Station tested positive for COVID-19. At that time the possibility of further infections could not be ruled out. Working at home - if possible - was encouraged to control the breakout. The employees affected included some with important tasks in the nuclear power plant. Engie Electrabel assured that the safety of the nuclear power plant would not be compromised. During the first wave in the spring, far fewer infections were detected.

In early December, a care home in Mol, Belgium celebrated Saint Nicholas Day, but an asymptomatic visitor spread the infection to 131 residents and 36 staff, turning the event into a superspreading event. 27 residents later died.

=== May to October 2021 – easing of lockdown ===
On 19 May, the Belgian Federal Police have launched a manhunt for a Belgian soldier who deserted and stolen military weapons. The unnamed soldier made death threats against Marc Van Ranst and has left letters saying that the soldier is willing to kill police officers. His letters also said that he can't live in a country "where politicians and virologists have taken everything away from us."

The man later named Jürgen Conings was later found dead, having killed himself after a manhunt.

=== October 2021 to March 2022 – new restrictions ===
The Consultative Committee announced new restrictions on 26 October, 17 November, 26 November and 3 December.

On 26 November, Belgium reported the first confirmed case of the Omicron variant in Europe; an unvaccinated person who had travelled from Egypt via Turkey on 11 November.

== Government response ==
=== Authorities ===
Efforts to address the COVID-19 pandemic in Belgium are managed by the nine federal and regional health ministers, Maggie De Block (Open VLD, federal government), Wouter Beke (CD&V, Flemish Community), Christie Morreale (PS, French Community), Antonios Antoniadis (SP, German-speaking Community), Bénédicte Linard (Ecolo, French Community), Valérie Glatigny (MR, French Community), Alain Maron (Ecolo, Brussels), Elke Van den Brandt (Groen, Brussels) and Barbara Trachte (Ecolo, Brussels), with the support of:

- the National Crisis Centre (NCCN) led by Bart Raeymaekers;
- the national public health institute of Belgium (Sciensano);
- the Risk Assessment Group (RAG) presided by Sciensano;
- the Risk Management Group (RMG) led by Paul Pardon MD;
- the Scientific Committee for Coronavirus (Steven Van Gucht, Marc Van Ranst, Nathalie Bossuyt, Erika Vlieghe and Charlotte Martin);
- other regional agencies such as the Agency for Care and Health in Flanders, the Agence wallonne pour une vie de qualité (AViQ) in Wallonia and the Common Community Commission in Brussels.

=== Containment measures ===
On 29 January, Belgium issued a travel notice advising against non-essential flights to China, Hong Kong excluded, with some travel companies cancelling all flights to China.

On 1 March, as a second case of coronavirus was confirmed in Belgium, the country entered into phase 2 of its response, with official measures focusing on preventing the virus from spreading within Belgium. The mayor of Sint-Lambrechts-Woluwe, Olivier Maingain, was one of the only mayors to take measures to prevent the spreading of the new coronavirus by restricting access to schools, sports facilities and public places for persons returning from areas at risk and only a few schools, such as the International School Ghent, quarantined pupils returning from infected areas, such as Northern Italy.

On 10 March, the government advised citizens to cancel any indoor scheduled events to be attended by more than 1,000 people for the month of March. Prime Minister Wilmès stressed this was not an interdiction but rather a recommendation. Schools remained open but are advised to cancel both trips abroad and multi-day excursions in general. Companies were advised to have their personnel work from home as much as possible and allow flexible working times to allow a better spread of public transport use throughout the day. The authorities called this reinforced phase 2.

Late in the evening on 12 March, after a meeting of the National Security Council, the Belgian government moved into the federal phase of crisis management, and ordered the closure of schools, discos, cafes and restaurants, and the cancellation of all public gatherings for sporting, cultural or festive purposes from Friday 13 March at midnight onwards. It was stressed that the measures taken were not a lockdown because people were not required to stay home.

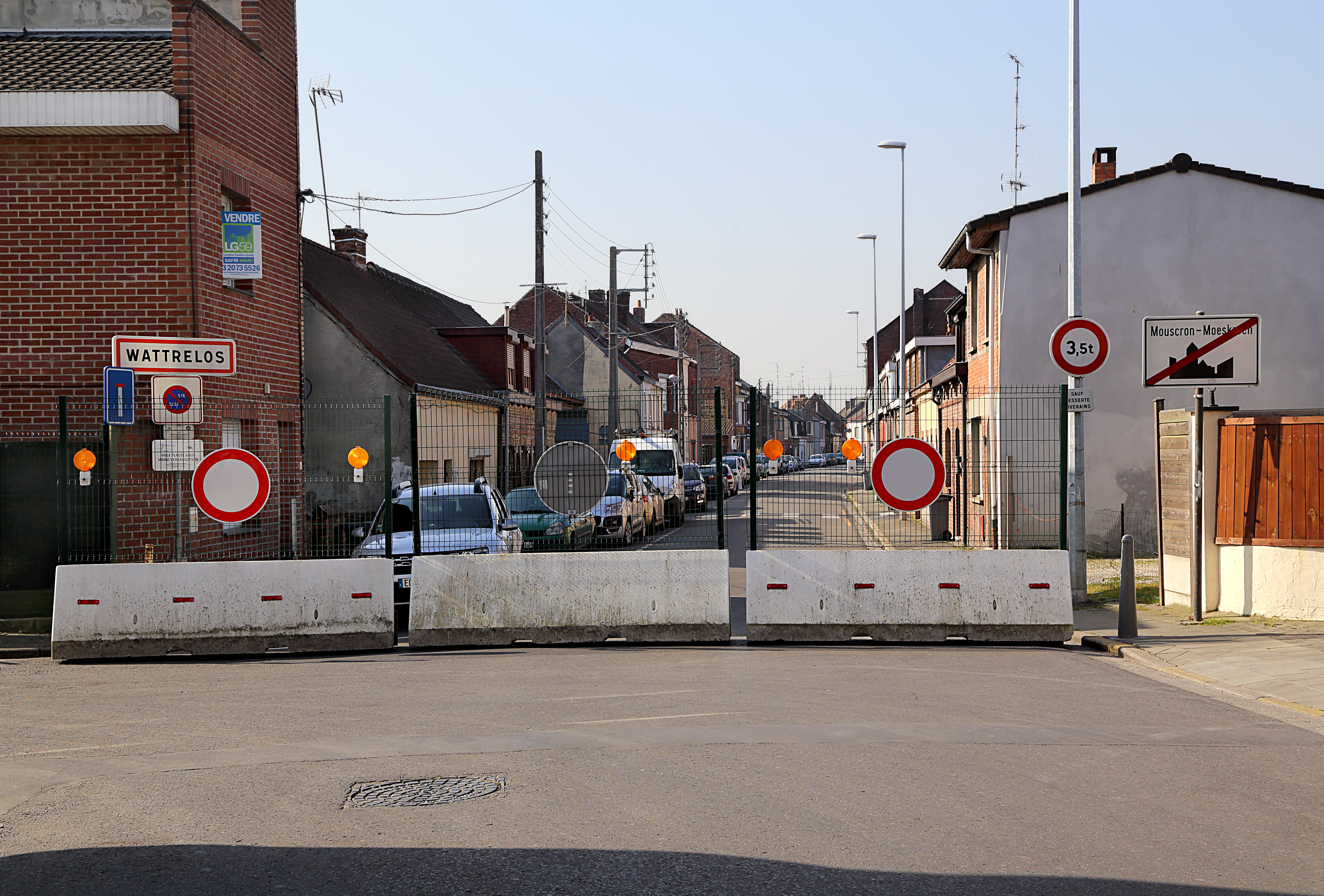
Concrete blocks in Mouscron, used to avoid all non-essential travel between France and Belgium (27 March 2020)

On 17 March, the National Security Council decided to take additional measures, based on the spread of COVID-19 in Belgium and on recommendations of experts. Stricter social distancing measures were imposed from noon the following day until 5 April, with non-essential travel prohibited, non-essential shops to close, gatherings banned, with penalties for corporate and individual persons who failed to comply with the restrictions.

On 20 March at 3 pm Belgium closed its borders to all non-essential travel. Earlier, the governor of West Flanders had complained about Dutch and French citizens coming to Belgium for tourism or shopping, while mayors of municipalities close to the border with the Netherlands such as Paul Van Miert of Turnhout urged their Dutch counterparts to request their national authorities in the Netherlands to implement similar measures as in Belgium, to stop Belgian citizens going to Dutch cafés or restaurants. From 25 March onwards, people arriving at Brussels Airport were handed a leaflet with the compelling advice to quarantine themselves for a fortnight.

On 27 March, the National Security Council and the governments decided to extend the measures until 19 April (end of the Easter vacation). On 15 April, the containment measures were extended until the 3 May.

=== Medical supplies and testing strategy ===
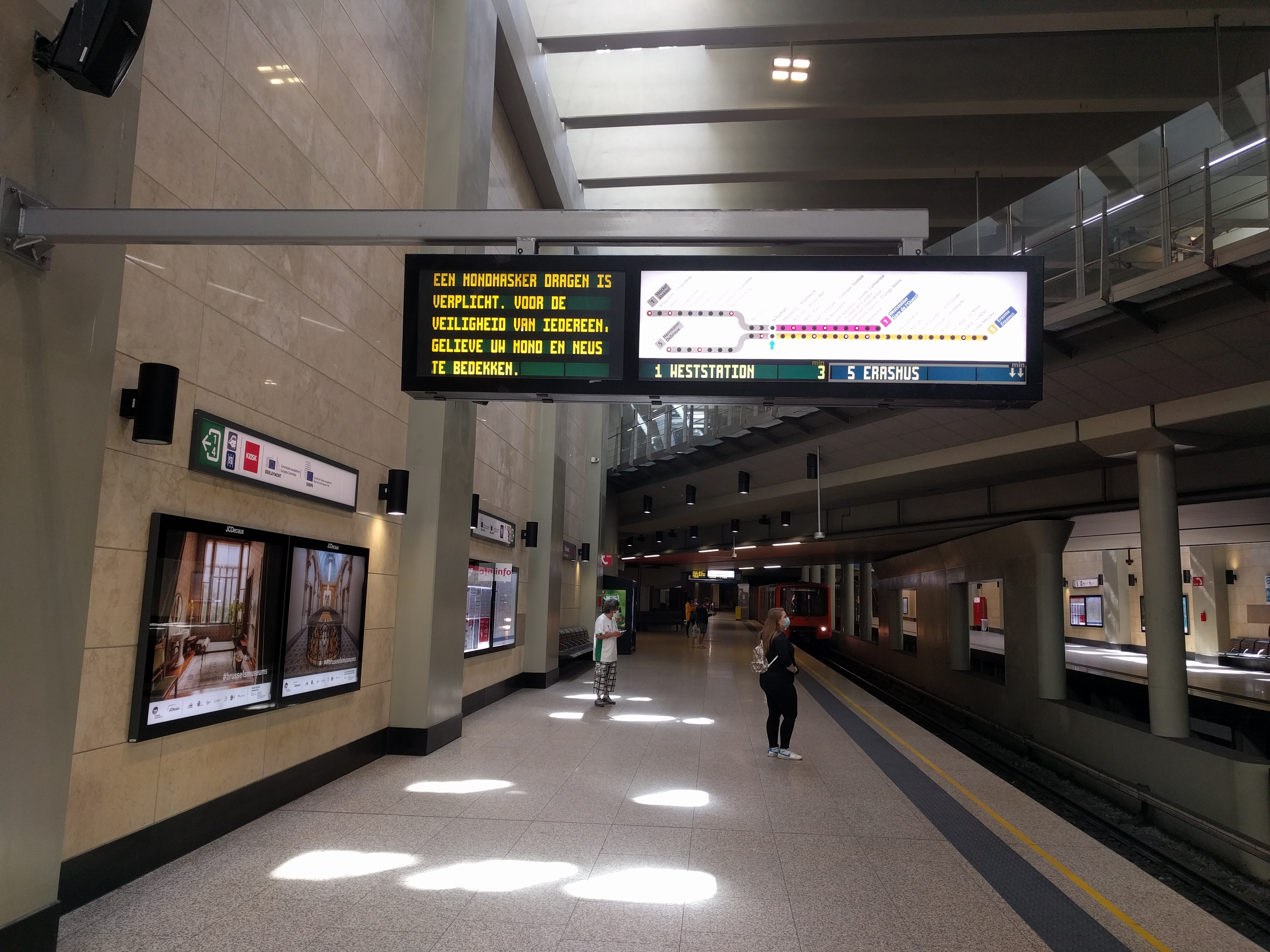
Wearing a mask is mandatory in the subway.

On 6 March, Federal Minister of Public Health Maggie De Block criticised EU governments for blocking the export of medical masks at a time when global stocks were decreasing, asserting that they were acting against the spirit of the European Union. On 19 March, a shipment of 100,000 FFP2 respirators arrived. On 16 March, the Chinese Alibaba foundation donated half a million surgical masks and 30 000 test kits, as a result of the intervention by King Philippe and with the support of the Walloon Export and Foreign Investment Agency (AWEX). Minister Philippe De Backer was assigned to coordinating the efforts of the authorities to supply masks and respirators.

While the number of tests capped at 3,500 and 4,500 a day, an increase in stocks of the materials required to perform tests was announced early April by the Federal Minister Philippe De Backer, to improve the testing capacity to 10,000 tests a day.

In an effort to support international research, Belgium pledged 5 million euro to the Coalition for Epidemic Preparedness Innovations (CEPI) which intends to develop a COVID-19 vaccine.

=== Exit strategy ===
On 7 April, a Group of Experts for an Exit Strategy (GEES), led by Erika Vlieghe and composed of 10 scientists, economists and top managers, was set up to advise the National Security Council on the restart of the country.

=== Communications ===
At the outset, the Belgian authorities, mostly through their federal Minister of health Maggie De Block, had focused on reassuring by asserting that there was no reason to panic, that Belgium has good hospitals and laboratories and that the government was attentive to the evolution and well prepared for the possible arrival of coronavirus.

From the first report of infection within Belgium, the government communicated on certain developments with the public. An official website (info-coronavirus.be) was registered by the authorities at the end of January, before the first case was officially confirmed. It has then been used by the Federal Public Service Health and the National Crisis Centre (NCCN) to inform the public. Since the 13 March, the FPS Health together with the NCCN has held a daily press conference led by spokesmen Benoît Ramacker, Peter Mertens and Yves Stevens with doctors Steven Van Gucht and Emmanuel André. Every day, the latest developments on the epidemiological situation in Belgium are reported, with the new figures of confirmed cases, hospitalised patients and deaths, as well as general explanations and forecasts, or reminders of the need to respect the social distancing measures. In an apparent effort at transparency, a daily epidemiological bulletin and a set of raw data are made available on the Belgian Institute for Health website.

The Prime Minister Sophie Wilmès addressed citizens twice via a web video in March and April 2020 to speak about the government's response to the pandemic.

Experts and authorities also used the media to express themselves throughout the crisis, either to reproach citizens organising or taking part in so-called lockdown parties, or otherwise to give their point of view. On 20 March, the chairman of the Scientific Committee expressed the hope that the measures that came into effect on 14 March would lead to a stabilisation of the number of hospitalisations starting from the middle of the week beginning 23 March. On 21 March, Prof. Dr. Erika Vlieghe of the Scientific Committee mentioned that she expected the peak of the pandemic to occur in early April.

On 16 March, King Philippe addressed the nation and called on all Belgians to respect the COVID-19 measures "for ourselves and for the most vulnerable among us".

=== Criticism ===
==== Handling of the crisis ====
While COVID-19 was already spreading to all regions of Italy in late February, the Belgian government has been criticised for its lack of action. Experts like Marc Wathelet, a virologist, urged for strict prevention measures, affirming that the Belgian federal minister of health Maggie De Block was underestimating the danger and Professor in microbiology Herman Goossens of the UZA in Antwerp, called for wider screening for the virus. Pharmacists complained they did not receive clear instructions from the authorities. Zorgnet Icuro, an umbrella organisation in the field of health care and care for the elderly, requested the Flemish Minister for Public health Wouter Beke to take stronger actions with respect to visitor access at retirement homes in Flanders.

When the first measures were taken by the Belgian government on 10 March, in the form of recommendations, some expressed that more drastic measures were required, like Professors Herman Goossens and Marc Van Ranst who questioned the set limit of maximum 1,000 people for indoor events. The BVAS/ABSyM, the biggest medical trade union in Belgium, warned for a potential collapse of the health care system and called for a closure of all schools at short notice as well as a ban on all gatherings of more than hundred people. In an open letter several Flemish rectors with experts in the fields of epidemiology, virology, biostatistics and health economics, including two members of the Scientific Committee for Coronavirus, urged the authorities to take decisive measures and to avoid non-binding instructions and guidelines. Similarly, Leopold Lippens, the mayor of Knokke-Heist, judged the actions of the federal authorities insufficient and therefore ordered the ban on all indoor and outdoor activities in his municipality.

Some media made positive criticism, such as the Financial Times who praised Belgium for its handling of the coronavirus crisis, claiming Belgium had shown that "a fragmented country" could still produce a clear response to the pandemic – by taking decisive actions earlier than other countries – and pointing out the daily briefings are not held by politicians but by scientific experts and spokespersons. De Standaard praised Steven Van Gucht, president of the Scientific Committee, for being "calm, empathic and wonderfully clear".

==== Shortage of medical supplies ====
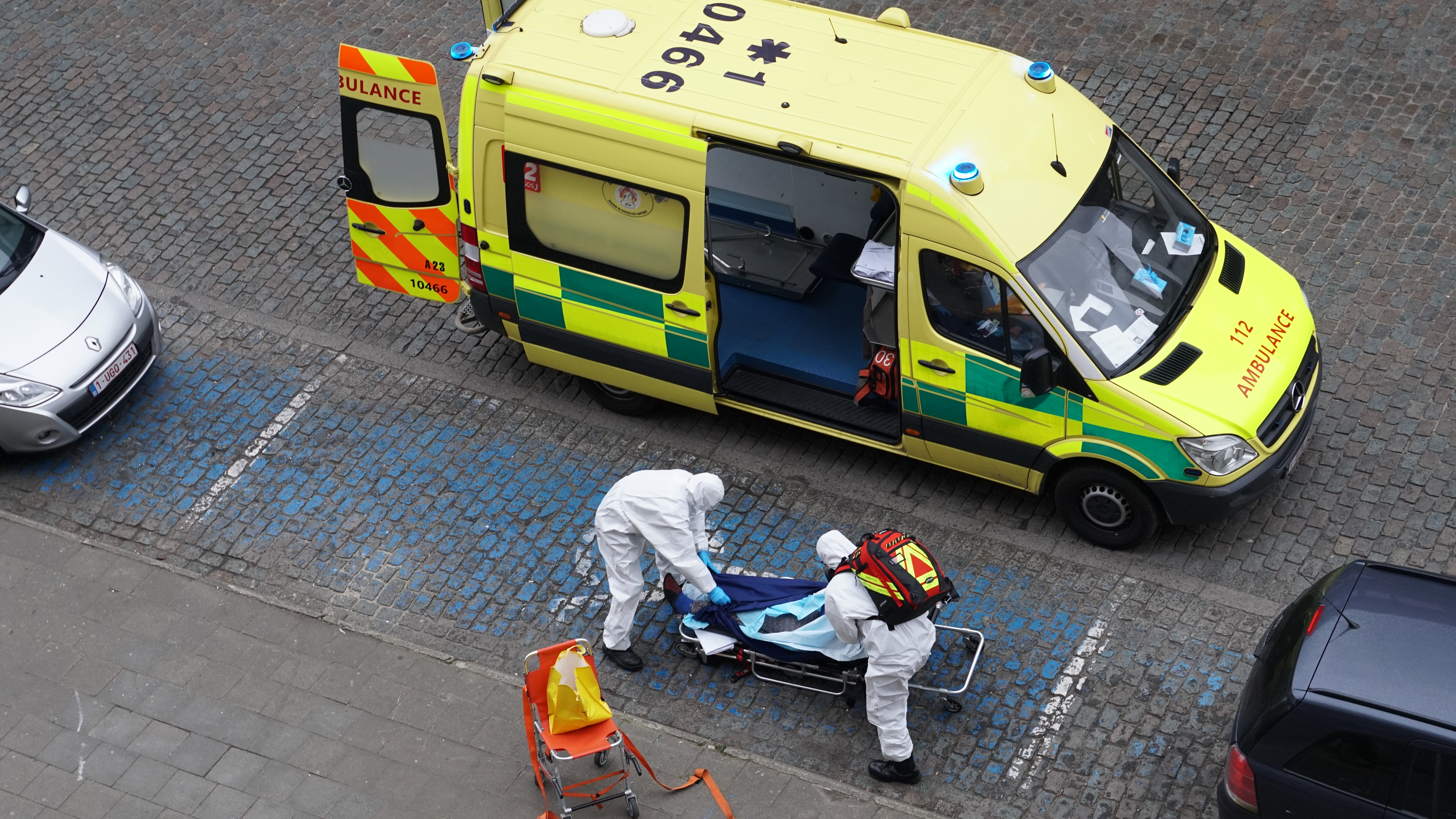
Ambulance workers in Brussels wearing PPE during an intervention.

Just as many countries in the world, Belgium faced a shortage of personal protective equipment (PPE) such as respirators, surgical masks or face shields.

Towards the end of January, Belgian newspapers highlighted the shortage of respirators and surgical masks and a retailer questioned whether Belgian would have enough masks if there were to be an outbreak of the virus, but the Federal Public Service Health claimed the Belgian hospitals had sufficient stock. On 8 March, Maggie De Block stated she had a solution for the shortage of masks but was unwilling to disclose the potential vendor and the number of masks involved. On 15 March De Standaard newspaper reported that the masks had not been delivered on time, and the following day De Block announced that her department's order of 5 million masks might have involved fraud. On 16 March, De Standaard reported that De Block had blundered by ordering all 5 million masks from a single company (M.O.S.S.A. vof), a consultancy firm that had no track record in the medical field and was owned by Mahmut Öz, a Belgo-Turkish politician from her own political affiliation. On 20 March, a shipment from China of 5 million masks arrived at the airport of Bierset, but these were surgical masks and not the type of respirators required to protect the medical staff. Hospitals such as the Centre Hospitalier Interrégional Edith Cavell (CHIREC) reported that they were in dire need of protective masks. On 25 March, PVDA-member of parliament Sofie Merckx complained that since 2009 the various governments had not renewed the strategic reserves of mouth masks due to cost-cutting measures in the health care system. Upon reaching their expiration date in 2018, minister of health Maggie De Block decided to destroy and not replace 6 million face masks.

On 7 March, Marc Van Ranst confirmed Belgium was facing a shortage of reagents to do widespread COVID-19 testing, and the laboratory reference (National Reference Centre) at the UZ Leuven was therefore forced to apply a triage system and to limit the number of tests. Two surgeons from St. Peter's Hospital in Brussels addressed an open letter to prime minister Wilmès on 22 March demanding increased testing.

==== Situation in care homes ====
In Belgium, the organisation of care homes falls under the regional authorities. On 11 March the care homes were closed for all visitors in Wallonia and Brussels, and a day later in Flanders.

After the closure, the sector requested more protective equipment, more training and guidelines for caretakers on how to handle infected patients, and more tests. However, not much was changed and the care homes kept operating with a lack of tests and a lack of protective equipment while being required to keep many infected residents in the homes. On Wednesday 1 April, the government finally promised to also provide more tests to the care homes by the end of the week. But as that deadline wasn't met, on Saturday 4 April, several care homes started to execute tests on their own. Meanwhile, several homes got hit hard with dozens of deaths, and up 90% of the residents and inhabitants being infected. These events led to severe criticism addressing the Flemish minister of public health Wouter Beke. Care organisations accused the minister of losing 3 weeks time, and being very late with an emergency plan. Only on 21 April, masks were advised for all personnel in contact with patients.

On 10 April, about 40% of all COVID-19 deaths in Belgium occurred in care homes. In Brussels, coronavirus cases have been confirmed in 116 of the 146 care homes.

==== High death toll and unusual method of counting ====
In April, Belgium had very high mortality figures, the highest death rate from COVID-19 in the world at that time.

Steven Van Gucht from Sciensano explained this was partly due to a difference in counting, compared to other countries. In Belgium, around 46% of the COVID-19 deaths occurred in hospital and 53% occurred in care homes; and while the deaths in hospital are all confirmed by a test, only 5% of the deaths in care homes are confirmed by a test, the other 95% being suspected cases. The Netherlands on the other hand, only counted confirmed cases.

This way of counting was criticised by Flemish Minister for Tourism, Zuhal Demir, as it would portray Belgium as bad in the fight against coronavirus and also would harm the Belgian reputation of being a prominent country in the pharmaceutical and biotech industries. Some doctors complained that deaths caused by other pathologies and causes have been lumped into the COVID-19 category. The virologist Marc Van Ranst, member of the Belgian Scientific Committee for Coronavirus, also criticised the way of counting, saying it is "dumb" that almost all deaths occurring in care homes are being counted as COVID-19 deaths, leading to what he described as an overestimate.

Belgian authorities however defend their strategy for being the most transparent and the most detailed method, even if it results in numbers that are "sometimes overestimated". According to Steven Van Gucht, responsible for the reporting strategy, the suspected deaths are being counted as COVID-19 deaths because not everyone can be tested but said this way of counting saved lives by pointing to the dire situation the care homes were in. After this criticism, the official daily reports started to distinguish the deaths figures between confirmed tested and simply suspected cases.

When several countries published excess mortality figures, it appeared that Belgium's way of counting caused the reported COVID-19 death toll in the country to be closer to the excess mortality figures, compared to other countries. For example, between 5 March and 5 April, Belgium reported 2,373 COVID-19 deaths with the excess mortality being estimated around 3,000. Causing still an underreporting of around 600 deaths. While the neighbouring Netherlands had an estimated excess mortality of 6,200, with only 3,197 reported COVID-19 deaths in that same period. Causing an underreporting of around 3000 deaths. According to professor Yves Van Laethem, Belgium uses the approach recommended by the World Health Organisation and the European Centre for Disease Prevention and Control, which congratulated Belgium for choosing this approach.

== Other responses ==
=== Healthcare sector and Belgian research ===
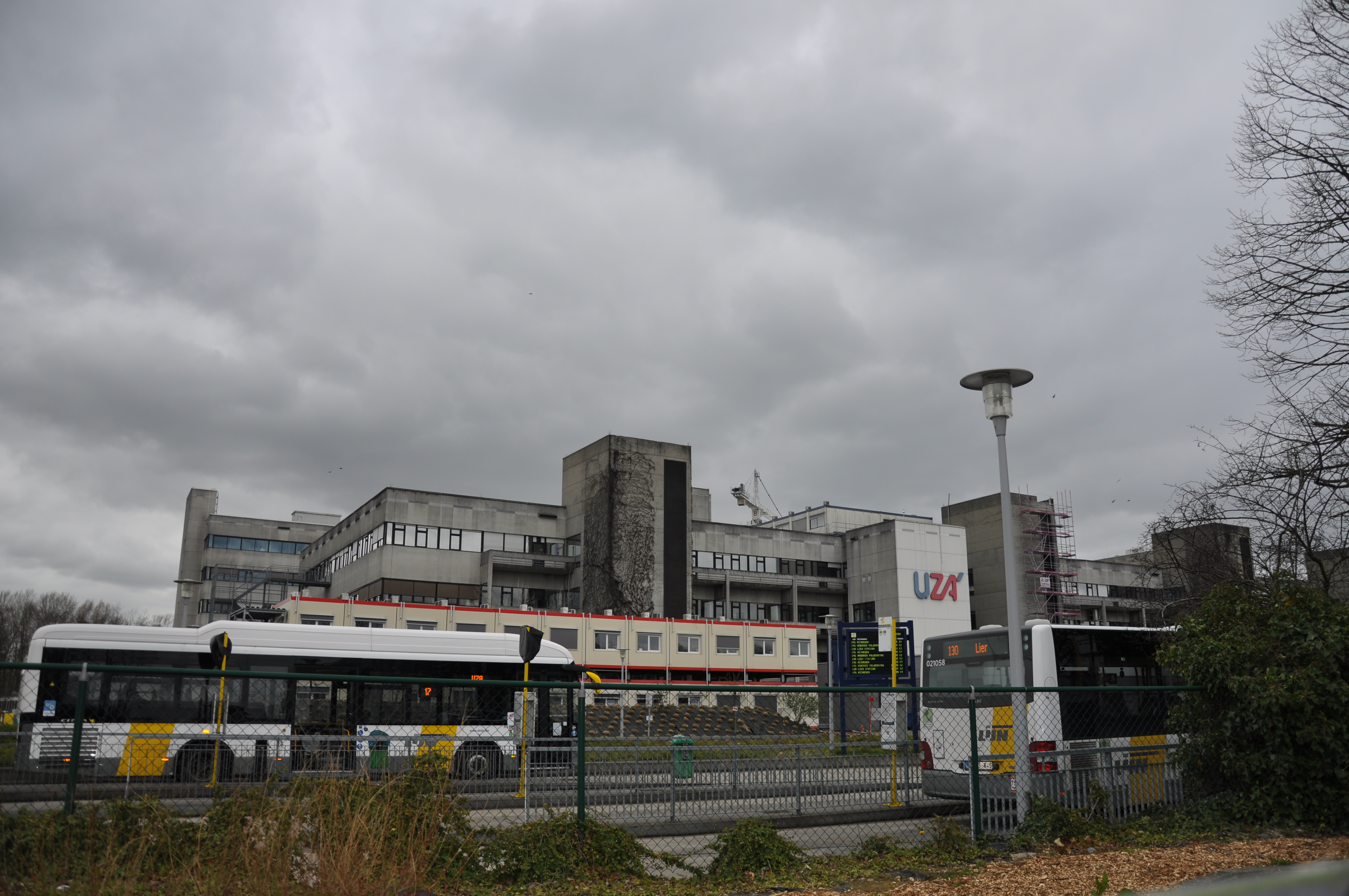
Hospital prefab-containers built next to the emergency department for the COVID-19 crisis at the University of Antwerp Hospital, 14 March 2020

To cope with the increasing influx of patients, several hospitals started to build new temporary facilities, such as the UZA clinic in Edegem with the construction of containers or St. Peter's Hospital in Brussels with the set up of outside tents supported by the Belgian Red Cross.

Even if Belgium belongs to the EU's top five in terms of intensive care unit (ICU) capacity, with a number quoted to be around 15.9 to 16.5 ICUs per 100 000 inhabitants before the outbreak of the pandemic, the Belgian hospitals started to increase their number of intensive care units around 10 March.

Some Belgian hospitals also appealed to the community to help, such as the UZ Leuven who called for mouth masks and financial support for research into the COVID-19, or Brussels' St. Peter's hospital who called for donations to buy life-saving ventilators.

Research to find a vaccine against COVID-19, medication for the lung disease or new test methods are concentrated in Belgium amongst others at the KU Leuven (vaccine and new medication, Prof Johan Neyts), at the University of Namur (new test method, Benoït Muylkens) and by private companies in collaboration with universities (new 15-minute test method detecting coronavirus antigens, CORIS BioConcept).

Studies conducted by Vrije Universiteit Brussel on patients that were being treated for small procedures and who did not have COVID-19 symptoms, showed that approximately 8 % had an infection in the lungs and were infected with the coronavirus, confirming the suspicion that many people are infected with the coronavirus without knowing and as herd immunity would prevent the spread of the coronavirus.

Attempts to predict the progress of the coronavirus spread with compartmental models are undertaken at Ghent University (Prof Jan M. Baetens) and Hasselt University (Prof Niel Hens). Professor Barbé at the Free University of Brussels-VUB uses a first order differential equation with two proxy variables. University of Antwerp, with the assistance of KU Leuven and Hasselt University, launched a study to assess the impact of the containment measures and the evolution of the epidemic in Belgium, through a series of online surveys.

=== Belgian industry ===
In an effort to alleviate the hand sanitiser shortage in Belgium, several Belgian companies started to make alcohol or to manufacture hand sanitisers themselves, like the pharmaceutical company Janssen Pharmaceutica, the brewing company AB InBev and the Sugar refinery of Tienen, reaching a total of 1 million liters of gel and ending the shortage in the country.

To make up for the shortage of medical masks, the Belgian textile sector was requested but unable to produce masks at short notice because of the lack of manufacturing capacity and of raw materials. Eventually around mid-April, two Belgian companies specialised in workwear and interiors for cars, announced they will together start producing surgical masks and FFP2 respirators.

The vaccines division of GlaxoSmithKline, which has its headquarters in Belgium, helped with providing its infrastructure and staff free of charge to carry out at least 6,000 PCR tests per day on their Rixensart site, participating in an increase of the number of analyses in the country, as of 9 April.

== Impact ==
=== Politics ===
While Belgium had been struggling to form a new federal government since the elections of 26 May 2019, the COVID-19 pandemic sparked new debate on the ongoing formation, as the actual minority caretaker government Wilmès I would not have all the ability to tackle the coronavirus crisis and its consequences.

The idea of forming an emergency government emerged. Representatives of N-VA and PS, the two majority parties that have not been able to come to an agreement so far, started to discuss again on 13 March, eventually joined by Open Vld, MR, CD&V and sp.a on 14 and 15 March. Those discussions however were inconclusive as Bart De Wever (N-VA) wanted to be the new Prime Minister and as PS and MR refused to nominate new Prime Minister and Ministers, arguing it would be a waste of time. Talks between political parties continued the next hours and were extended to Ecolo, Groen, cdH and DéFI.

An agreement has finally been found on 16 March under the form of a continuation of the Wilmès I Government, with the exception that the government now has full legislative powers rather than being just a caretaker government. The new Wilmès II Government composed of MR, Open Vld and CD&V, while representing only 38 of the 150 representatives, will be supported by opposition parties PS, sp.a, Groen, Ecolo, cdH and DéFI within the limits of handling the coronavirus crisis in Belgium. The government also received certain plenary powers to deal with the pandemic quickly and effectively.

=== Economics ===
Following the containment measures of the federal government, many Belgian businesses had to shut down temporarily or have reduced staff numbers at work, resulting in 1.25 million people on temporary unemployment.

Belgian companies suffer from the coronavirus crisis, such as producers of fries who reported a drop in demand for potato specialities.

Just as most airlines in the world, the national flag carrier Brussels Airlines suspended all its commercial flights as of 21 March, originally until 19 April but delayed the restart of operations first until 15 May, then until 1 June, then gradually from 15 June.

With bars, cafes and other businesses closed, Belgian breweries started delivering directly to people self-isolating at home. Some bars and cafes have raised funds by selling advance vouchers that are redeemable when the establishments reopen.

=== Society and environment ===
From 12 March onwards many people started hoarding for the next one and a half-week, which led to a significant increase in sales.

The closures and bans ordered by the authorities led to cancellation of many events in the country. For example, Chinese New Year celebrations were cancelled at the University of Leuven.

The amount of traffic on Belgian roads dropped sharply after shutdown measures were implemented: traffic dropped by 45% and the structural traffic jams disappeared completely.

The Belgian Institute for Space Aeronomy reported that the strong decrease in car and air traffic due to the confinement measures does not necessarily entail as strong a decrease in air pollution. Belgian researchers at the Royal Observatory of Belgium noticed a drop of the background noise on the seismic data that could be the result of transport networks and other human activities being shut down.

== Statistics ==
=== Definitions ===
Number of cases (blue) and number of deaths (red) on a logarithmic scale based on numbers reported by the ECDC

==== Confirmed infections ====
The number of confirmed infections is the number of samples tested positive by a reference laboratory. It is estimated that the actual number of cases is much higher than the number of confirmed cases, the tests being limited to specific people and/or to people with severe symptoms. Diagnosed cases are an underestimate of the real number by a factor of between 5 and 10 according to Professor Marc Van Ranst.

In the period of 1 to 6 March the number of detected cases grew on average exponentially with a doubling of the number of cases every day. In the period between 7 and 27 March the number of confirmed cases doubled on average every 3.7 days (20.9 % daily increase).

==== Recoveries ====
The official reports from the national public health institute of Belgium do not refer to recovered people but only to discharged patients.

The patients are discharged after resolution of symptoms, even though they are not being tested again before leaving the hospital. The number of recovered people who were tested positive but not admitted to hospital remains unknown as there is no follow-up on these cases. The total number of recoveries is therefore underestimated, particularly in a context where there are many undetected positive cases presenting mild symptoms and recovering as well. The situation is similar in France.

The first recovered case was on 15 February 2020. As of 5 April, Sciensano reported a total of 3,986 discharged patients since the 15 March.

==== Deaths ====
Cumulative number of deaths per million inhabitants for European Union countries, over time. The legend is sorted in descending order of these values. Countries without COVID-19 deaths are omitted. Logarithmic vertical axis. Data source: ECDC.

In the period between 17 and 21 March the number of deaths due to COVID-19 doubled on average every 1.4 days (64 % daily increase). Up to 3 April 2020, 92 % of the fatalities in Belgium were 65 years of age or older, 0.6 % were younger than 45 years and 58 % were men. The youngest fatality overall in Belgium was a 12-year-old girl while the oldest person to die was 104 years old.

On 25 March 2020, Belgium ranked sixth in the list of EU countries with the highest numbers of casualties, while on 1 April Belgium had the third highest death toll after Italy and Spain. As of 3 April the case fatality rate of the COVID-19 disease is in Belgium similar to the neighbouring countries The Netherlands and France but much higher than in Germany. However, not all countries count the deaths in the same way. Belgium includes deaths that occur not only in hospitals, but in other locations such as care homes. Deaths with clinical symptoms of the coronavirus disease are considered as "suspicious" and are included in the figures of COVID-19 deaths, even if they were not tested.

By 14 March 2021, Belgium reports a total of 22,421 deaths.

===== Notable people =====
- Philippe Bodson, 75, politician and businessman (4 April 2020)
- Marc Engels, 54, audio engineer (9 April 2020)
- Henri Kichka, 94, writer and Holocaust survivor (25 April 2020)
- Hugo Ryckeboer, 84, dialectologist (21 May 2020)
- Fons Verplaetse, 90, former governor of the National Bank of Belgium (NBB) (15 October 2020)
- Willy Kuijpers, 83, politician (17 November 2020)
- Joël Robert, 77, former world champion motorcyclist (13 January 2021)

=== By location ===
Unlike most neighbouring countries (the Netherlands, France, Germany and the UK), the Belgian authorities were not initially willing to provide information or statistics on where the cases are located, beyond statistics for each region: Flanders, Brussels and Wallonia.

Sciensano started to publish statistics per province on 18 March 2020. In the period between 17 and 21 March it became clear that the province of Limburg was a hotspot for the coronavirus where the incidence grew much faster compared to the rest of the country: while on 17 March the incidence in Limburg was 1.5 times the average incidence for the country, this had already increased to 1.9 times the average incidence on 21 March.

Sciensano started to publish a map with incidence numbers per municipality starting 26 March.

The daily Sciensano report of 28 March saw a spectacular rise of the incidence numbers for the province of Liège: from 19 confirmed cases per 100 000 population on 27 March it rose to 77. This was due to underreporting by a lab in the province. On 29 March the province of Liège even became the second worst affected province in Belgium after Limburg.

=== Graphs ===
The graphs below are based on the data collected by Sciensano (Belgian Institute for Public Health), as per the actual dates.
Because of the use of actual dates and as some delay occurs in reporting, all figures are subject to retrospective updating.

==== Total cases in Belgium (cumulative) ====
View source data.
View source data.
View source data.
View source data.
View source data.

(Data from the last two days still have to be consolidated by Sciensano.)

View source data.

==== 7-day running average for daily new cases, hospitalisations, discharges and deaths ====
View source data.

==== Confirmed new cases per day ====
View source data.

==== Confirmed deaths per day ====
View source data.

==== Tests and new confirmed cases per day in Belgium (March to September 2020) ====
(Data from the last two days still have to be consolidated by Sciensano.)

View source data.

==== Change of hospitalisations per day in Belgium (March to May 2020) ====
View source data.

==== Active cases in hospital per day (incl. ICU) (March to September 2020) ====
View source data.

==== Confirmed new cases per day by region ====
(Data from the last two days still have to be consolidated by Sciensano.)

View source data.

==== Logistic growth models ====
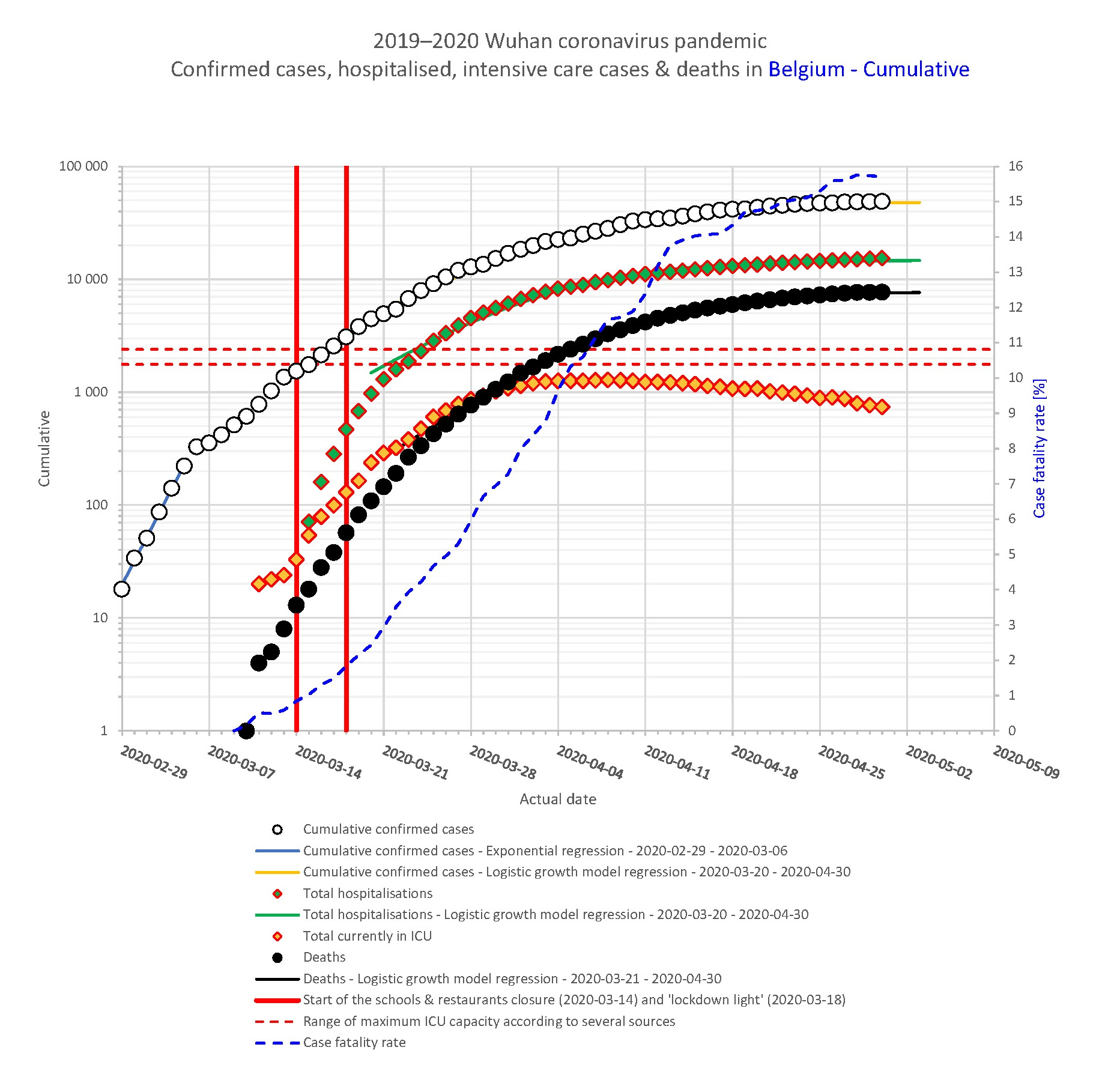
Semi-logarithmic graph of the number of confirmed cases, hospitalisations, intensive care cases and deaths in Belgium as of 2020-04-30

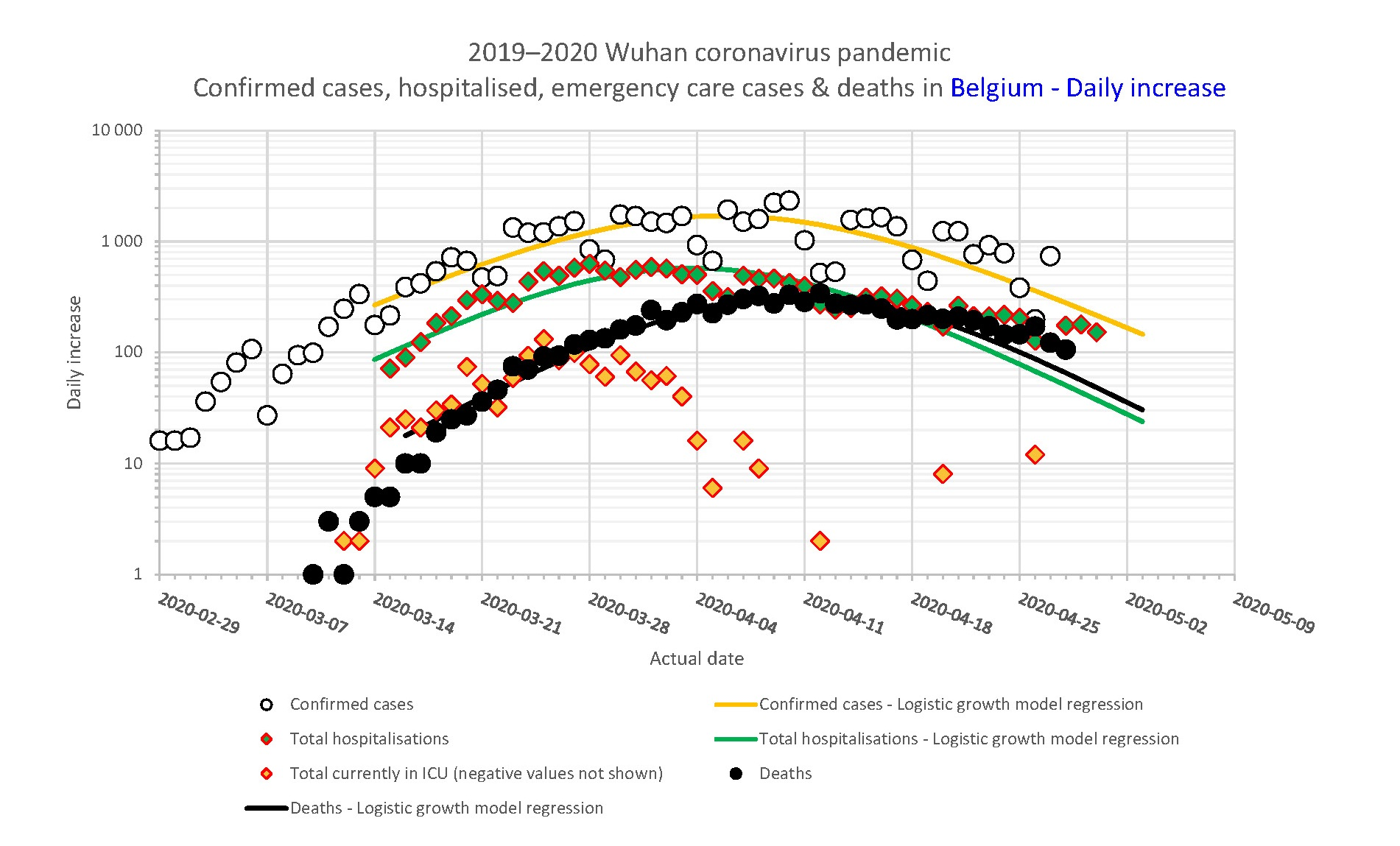
Graph of the number of daily increase of confirmed cases, hospitalisations, intensive care cases and deaths in Belgium as of 2020-04-30

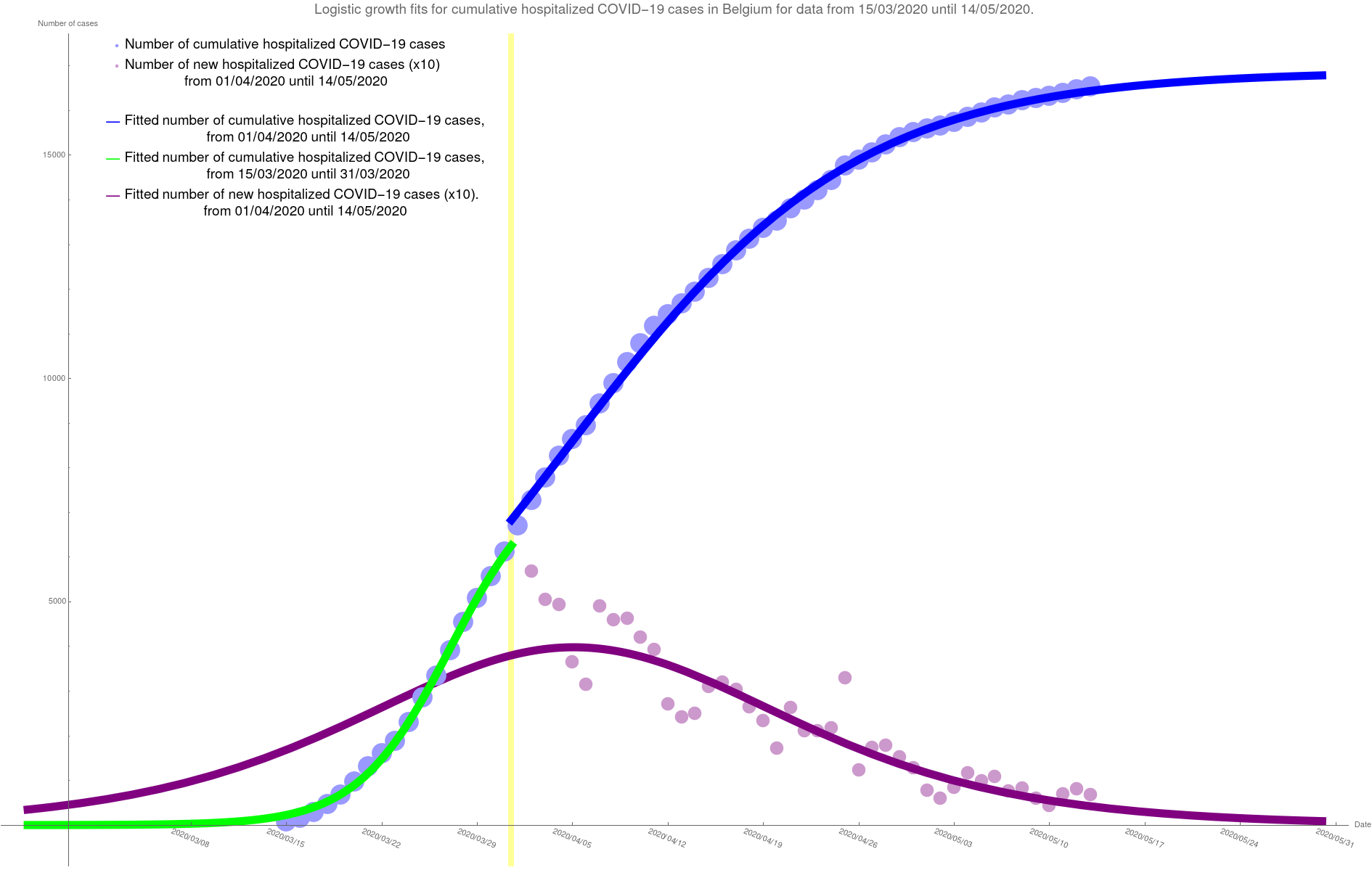
Logistic growth modelfits for hospitalised COVID-19 cases in Belgium for data from 15 March 2020 until 14 May 2020. We can make out two phases separated by the yellow vertical line. One from 15 March 2020 until 31 March 2020 (with a fit in green) and the one from 1 April 2020 until 14 May 2020 (with a fit in blue). The initial phase (green) had exponential growth/decline rate of 29.3% and the total number of cumulated hospitalised cases stabilises at 7948. The second phase (blue) has exponential growth/decline rate of 9.44% and the total number of cumulated hospitalised cases stabilises at 16878. Also shown in purple is the fitted new hospitalisations from 1 April 2020 until 14 May 2020 (corresponding to the blue fit for cumulative data). Beyond 14 May the curves shown are only a trend according to the logistic growth model, these have an uncertainty range associated to them and should not be seen as a prediction.

== See also ==
- COVID-19 pandemic in Europe
- COVID-19 pandemic by country and territory
- COVID-19 pandemic in France
- COVID-19 pandemic in the Netherlands
