= Agency for Care and Health (Flanders) =

Flemish government agency

- Agentschap Zorg en Gezondheid (in Dutch)

Agency overview
- Formed: April 1, 2006
- Jurisdiction: Flemish Community
- Headquarters: Ellipse Building; King Albert II Lane 35; 1030 Schaerbeek; 50.862685°N 4.359170°E
- Employees: 285 (as of 2018)
- Annual budget: 3,850,000,000 EUR
- Minister responsible: Jo Vandeurzen, Minister of Welfare, Public Health and Family
- Parent department: Department of Welfare, Public Health and Family
- Website: www.zorg-en-gezondheid.be

Footnotes
- "Agency for Care and Health" is the official English translation according to the Flanders Information Agency.

The Agency for Care and Health (in Dutch: Agentschap Zorg en Gezondheid) is an agency of the Flemish Government. The Flemish Government is the executive branch of the Flemish Community of Belgium. In Belgium, the Communities are responsible for certain aspects of social care, health care and public health policy. The Agency for Care and Health is responsible for the recognition, licensing and subsidising of various providers and services for health care, elderly care, home care, residential care, and other forms of care, for facilitating the cooperation and data sharing between these services, for the organisation of preventive health services such as vaccinations and screening programs, for the control of infectious diseases, for environmental health monitoring, and for the organisation of the Flemish social protection programs. The Agency for Care and Health relies on the Flemish Care Inspectorate for the inspection of any of the services it is responsible for.

The agency has a yearly budget of around 3,850,000,000 euros, of which about half goes to the financing of elderly care. As of 2018, the agency has 285 employees, to which 12 employees will be added in 2019. These employees will be transferred from the National Institute for Health and Disability Insurance as a result of the sixth Belgian state reform, in which some additional competences were transferred from the Belgian federal government to the Communities.

The agency is part of the so-called Welfare, Public Health and Family policy area, which consists of the Department of Welfare, Public Health and Family and a few associated agencies such as the Agency for Care and Health. The minister responsible for the agency is the minister of Welfare, Public Health and Family of the Flemish Government. The current minister in the Bourgeois Government, which assumed office in 2014, is Jo Vandeurzen of the Christian Democratic and Flemish party. The agency itself is led by an administrator-general.

== See also ==
- Federal Public Service Health (Belgium)
- Healthcare in Belgium
