= Youth Welfare Agency (Flanders) =

- Agentschap Jongerenwelzijn (in Dutch)

Agency overview
- Formed: April 1, 2006
- Jurisdiction: Flemish Community
- Headquarters: Ellipse Building; King Albert II Lane 35; 1030 Schaerbeek; 50.862685°N 4.359170°E
- Annual budget: 492,082,000 EUR (2017)
- Minister responsible: Jo Vandeurzen, Minister of Welfare, Public Health and Family
- Parent department: Department of Welfare, Public Health and Family
- Website: www.jongerenwelzijn.be

Footnotes
- "Youth Welfare Agency" is the official English translation according to the Flanders Information Agency.

The Youth Welfare Agency (in Dutch: Agentschap Jongerenwelzijn) is an agency of the Flemish Government responsible for child welfare.

== Background ==
The Flemish Government is the executive branch of the Flemish Community of Belgium. In Belgium, the Communities are responsible for most aspects of child welfare, with the exception of juvenile courts and a few youth detention centers, for which the federal authorities are responsible.

== Operations ==
The Youth Welfare Agency recognises and subsidises private providers and services for child welfare, organises the foster care system and manages the social services at juvenile courts in Flanders, so-called community institutions where juvenile delinquents and minors in a problematic situation at home are committed, and other child welfare institutions. The agency's budget for 2017 was 492,082,000 euros.

== History ==
The Youth Welfare Agency was created during the reform of the Flemish public administration in 2006, when the former Exceptional Youth Assistance and Community Institutions administration divisions were merged. The agency was officially founded on April 1, 2006, and was given the status of a so-called internally autonomous agency without legal personality. The agency is part of the so-called Welfare, Public Health and Family policy area, which consists of the Department of Welfare, Public Health and Family and a few associated agencies such as the Youth Welfare Agency. The minister responsible for the agency is the minister of Welfare, Public Health and Family of the Flemish Government. The current minister in the Bourgeois Government, which assumed office in 2014, is Jo Vandeurzen of the Christian Democratic and Flemish party. The agency itself is led by an administrator-general.

In June 2018, the Flemish government decided on a proposal of minister Jo Vandeurzen to merge the Flemish Child and Family Agency with the Youth Welfare Agency, in order to achieve an integrated policy around children. 'Youth and Family Agency' was chosen as a working name for the new agency that would be founded.
