= Child and Family Agency (Flanders) =

Flemish government agency

- Agentschap Kind en Gezin (in Dutch)

Agency overview
- Formed: April 1, 2006
- Jurisdiction: Flemish Community
- Headquarters: Hallepoortlaan 27; 1060 Saint-Gilles; 50.834450°N 4.341984°E
- Minister responsible: Jo Vandeurzen, Minister of Welfare, Public Health and Family
- Parent department: Department of Welfare, Public Health and Family
- Website: www.kindengezin.be

Footnotes
- "Child and Family Agency" is the official English translation according to the Flanders Information Agency.

The Child and Family Agency (in Dutch: Agentschap Kind en Gezin, often just called Kind en Gezin) is an agency of the Flemish Government. The Flemish Government is the executive branch of the Flemish Community of Belgium. In Belgium, the Communities are responsible for the provision of child and family services. The Child and Family Agency has three main tasks: the regulation and subsidising of child care services (the agency does not provide child care services itself), the provision of preventive family support services (such as prenatal guidance, vaccinations and child development testing through infant welfare clinics and home visits) and guidance to parents and children in cases of adoption. The agency also recognises and subsidises so-called confidential centres on child abuse, which offer voluntary assistance in cases of child abuse or child neglect. For the inspection of child care services, the agency relies on the Flemish Care Inspectorate.

The agency is part of the so-called Welfare, Public Health and Family policy area, which consists of the Department of Welfare, Public Health and Family and a few associated agencies such as the Child and Family Agency. The minister responsible for the agency is the minister of Welfare, Public Health and Family of the Flemish Government. The current minister in the Bourgeois Government, which assumed office in 2014, is Jo Vandeurzen of the Christian Democratic and Flemish party. The agency itself is led by an administrator-general.

== History ==
The Child and Family Agency has its roots in the National Work for Child Welfare, which was founded in 1919 just after World War I by the national government of Belgium. During the second state reform in 1980, the responsibility for child and family policy was transferred to the newly created Communities of Belgium. As a result, the National Work for Child Welfare was split, and in 1984 the Child and Family institution was created as its successor for the Flemish Community. In 1987, the institution was officially founded as a Flemish public institution (in Dutch: Vlaamse openbare instelling, shortened to VOI). During the reform of the Flemish public administration in 2006, the institution became a so-called internally autonomous agency with legal personality of the Welfare, Public Health and Family policy area.

In June 2018, the Flemish government decided on a proposal of minister Jo Vandeurzen to merge the Child and Family Agency with the Flemish Youth Welfare Agency, in order to achieve an integrated policy around children. 'Youth and Family Agency' was chosen as a working name for the new agency that would be founded.

== See also ==
- Yvonne Nèvejean
