= KCE =

KCE may refer to:

- Kinetic capillary electrophoresis
- King Country Energy, a New Zealand electricity company
- Konami Computer Entertainment, Japan
- Belgian Health Care Knowledge Centre
