= Federal Agency for the Safety of the Food Chain =

Coordinates: 50.852946°N 4.365278°E

- In Dutch: Federaal Agentschap voor de Veiligheid van de Voedselketen (FAVV); In French: Agence Fédérale pour la Sécurité de la Chaîne Alimentaire (AFSCA); In German: Föderalagentur für die Sicherheit der Nahrungsmittelkette (FASNK)
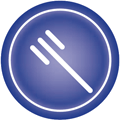
- Agency logo featuring a stylized (pitch)fork

Agency overview
- Formed: January 1, 2000; 26 years ago
- Preceding agencies: Ministry of Social Affairs, Public Health and Environment; Ministry of Agriculture
- Jurisdiction: Belgium
- Headquarters: Food Safety Center, City of Brussels
- Employees: 2,800 employees (2020)
- Annual budget: 166,000,000 EUR (2017)
- Minister responsible: Denis Ducarme, Federal minister of Agriculture
- Agency executive: Herman Diricks, CEO (anno 2018)
- Parent department: FPS Public Health, Food Chain Safety and Environment
- Website: www.fasfc.be

The Federal Agency for the Safety of the Food Chain (FASFC) is an authority tasked with ensuring the quality and safety of foodstuffs in Belgium, and safeguarding plant, animal and human health this way. It controls and inspects all processes in the food industry "from farm to fork", meaning all food production, food processing, food distribution and food service. With food safety in mind, the agency is also responsible for combating animal and plant diseases.

== Organisation ==
The agency is an 'organism of public interest' (parastatal body) type A according to Belgian public law. It was founded after the dioxin affair rocked Belgium in 1999, which was caused by the use of animal feed contaminated with polychlorinated biphenyls. Through the food chain, the toxic contamination made its way to supermarkets and consumers, inciting a nationwide scandal when it was discovered. At its foundation, the agency inherited all inspection tasks related to food safety from the relevant services of the federal Ministry of Social Affairs, Public Health and Environment, and of the federal Ministry of Agriculture.

For its part, the FASFC defends its decision, based on a tightening of the European standards in force. In June 2015, the producer, after having hesitated to engage in a showdown with the agency, declared that he had to definitively stop production, the continuation of his activity seeming to him to be impossible from now on. In March 2016, the agency was criticized for having tried to modify its article on Wikipedia, in order to remove the mention of this case.

Anno 2018, the agency operates under the authority of the Belgian federal minister of Agriculture. As of 2017, the agency has a budget of 166 million euros and is served by 2800 employees.

== See also ==
- Federal Agency for Medicines and Health Products
- Federal Public Service Health, Food Chain Safety and Environment
- Sciensano
