= Smart ligand =

Sub-type of substance that forms a complex with a biomolecule

Smart ligands are affinity ligands selected with pre-defined equilibrium ($K_{d}$), kinetic ($k_{off}$, $k_{on}$) and thermodynamic (ΔH, ΔS) parameters of biomolecular interaction.

Ligands with desired parameters can be selected from large combinatorial libraries of biopolymers using instrumental separation techniques with well-described kinetic behaviour, such as kinetic capillary electrophoresis (KCE), surface plasmon resonance (SPR), microscale thermophoresis (MST), etc. Known examples of smart ligands include DNA smart aptamers; however, RNA and peptide smart aptamers can also be developed.

Smart ligands can find a set of unique applications in biomedical research, drug discovery and proteomic studies. For example, a panel of DNA smart aptamers has been recently used to develop affinity analysis of proteins with ultra-wide dynamic range of measured concentrations.
