= Belgian Health Care Knowledge Centre =

Belgian research institute

Coordinates: 50.852981°N 4.365351°E

Belgian Health Care Knowledge Centre (KCE)
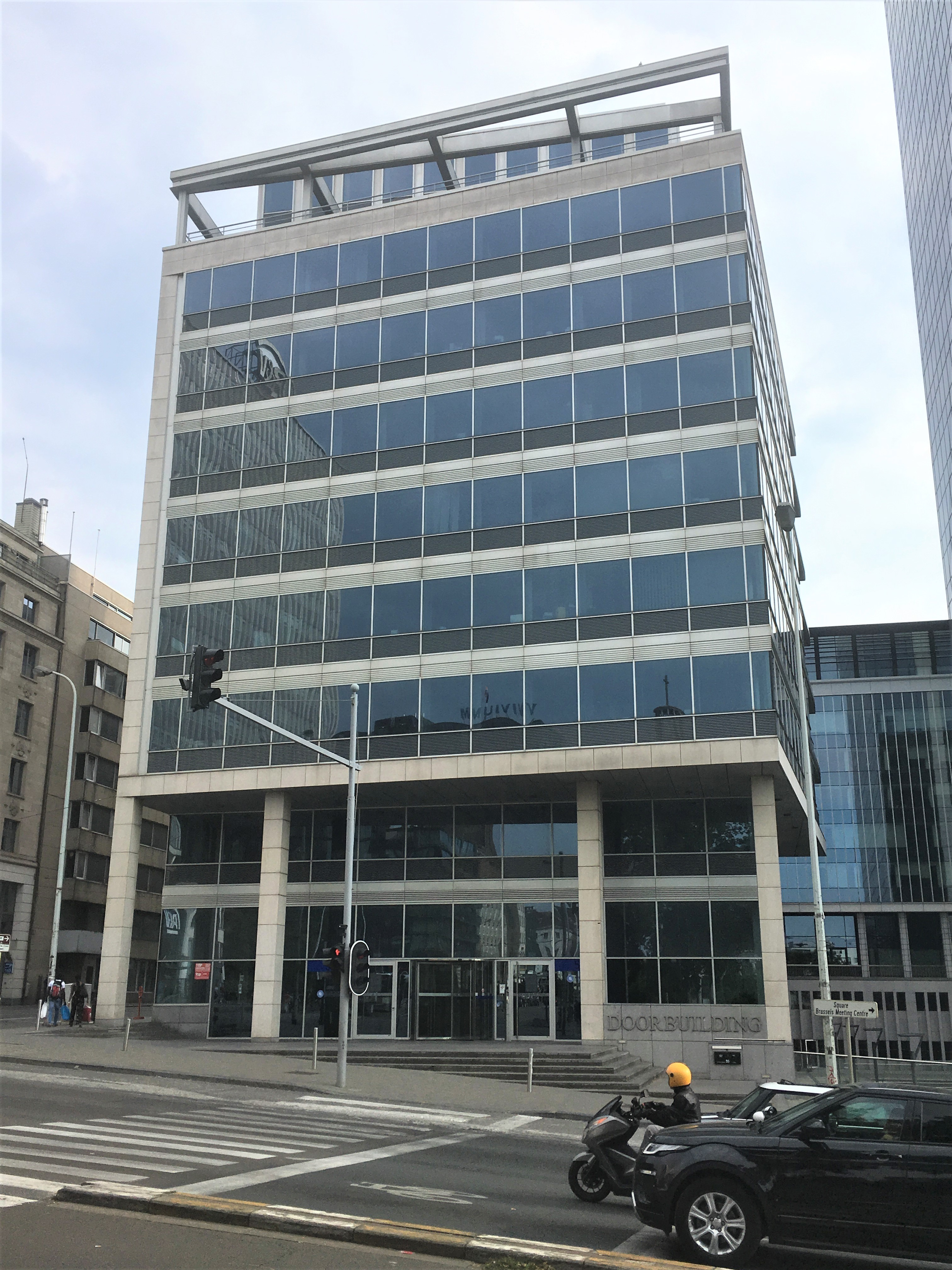
- Belgian Health Care Knowledge Centre head office
- Established: December 31, 2002
- Budget: Ca. 10,000,000 EUR (general budget); Ca. 10,000,000 EUR (trials programme)
- Field of research: Health services research; Health technology assessments; Good clinical practices; Research methods; Clinical research
- Director: Christian Léonard (ad interim anno 2018)
- Staff: 58,6 FTE (anno 2017)
- Location: City of Brussels, Belgium
- Website: kce.fgov.be

The Belgian Health Care Knowledge Centre (abbreviated to KCE) is an independent federal research institute in Belgium that provides multidisciplinary scientific advice to relevant persons and authorities on topics related to health care. More specifically, the KCE carries out research on the organisation and financing of the health system (health services research), assesses health technologies and drugs (health technology assessment), establishes guidelines for clinical practice and updates them according to the latest scientific evidence (good clinical practices), and establishes validated methods for research in the field of health care and public health. Asides from producing scientific reports on these topics, the KCE also maintains a clinical research programme in which it selects and funds non-commercial clinical trials. Lastly, the KCE critically reviews, analyses, and summarizes publications from foreign research institutes and peer reviewed journals that could be of interest to Belgian clinicians and authorities.

== Organisation ==
The KCE is a so-called 'organism of public interest' (parastatal body) type B according to Belgian public law. It was founded in 2003 and operates under the administrative authority of the Federal minister of Public Health of Belgium. Its annual budget is approximately 10,000,000 euros, and originates for about 75% from the National Institute for Health and Disability Insurance (NIHDI) and for about 25% from the Federal Public Service Health and the Federal Public Service Social Security. Additionally, the KCE disposes over a budget of approximately 10,000,000 euros for its clinical trials programme, which fully originates from the NIHDI. It also receives European subsidies for its participation in certain international projects. As of 2017, it has an in-house research staff of about 45 researchers, including clinicians, health economists, human scientists, data analysts and statisticians. The KCE can also rely on a network of external experts and institutions, such as universities, to carry out studies and research through public tenders, and provide external validation of its reports.

== See also ==
- Sciensano
