= HH10 =

HH10 or HH-10 may refer to:

- War of Honor, the tenth novel in the Honor Harrington series by David Weber, abbreviated HH10
- HH10, one of the Hamburger–Hamilton stages in chick development
- HH10, one of the hammerhead ribozymes
- TAC3, Tachykinin-3, also called HH10

== See also ==
- H10 (disambiguation)
