= Care Inspectorate =

Care Inspectorate may refer to:

- Care Inspectorate (Flanders), a Belgian government department for health and welfare services
- Care Inspectorate (Scotland), a UK regulatory body for social work and social care services in Scotland
- Care Inspectorate Wales, a UK regulatory body for social work and social care services in Wales
