= Ranst (disambiguation) =

Ranst is a municipality in the province of Antwerp in Belgium.

Ranst or van Ranst or variant, may also refer to:

== People ==
- Constantin Ranst de Jonge (1635–1714; Latin: Constantinus Ranst), Dutch businessman
- C. W. Van Ranst (1892–1972), U.S. race driver
- Marc Van Ranst (born 1965), Belgian public health official and virologist
- Maurice Van Ranst, Olympic champion for Belgium at the 1920 Olympics

== Other uses ==
- Ranst Heliport, Antwerpen, Belgium; see List of airports in Belgium
- Ranst, a planned tram stop on the Tram route 8 (Antwerp)
