= Belgian Centre for Evidence-Based Medicine =

Belgian research institute

- Centre Belge pour l'Evidence-Based Medicine; Belgisch Centrum voor Evidence-Based Medicine
- Abbreviation: CEBAM
- Formation: 2002
- Type: Medical research institute
- Headquarters: Belgium
- Region served: Belgium
- Official language: Dutch, French

Belgian Centre for Evidence-Based Medicine (CEBAM) (French: Centre Belge pour l'Evidence-Based Medicine, Dutch: Belgisch Centrum voor Evidence-Based Medicine) is an independent, multidisciplinary and inter-university medical research institute in Belgium, established in 2002 at the request of the Belgian federal government in collaboration with Belgian universities.

The organisation was created in cooperation with Belgian universities and supported by the Belgian National Institute for Health and Disability Insurance (RIZIV/INAMI), to examine the scientific basis of medical practices, validate clinical practice guidelines, and provide methodological support to organisations that develop clinical guidelines in Belgium. CEBAM is a proponent for the use of evidence-based medicine(EBM) among healthcare professionals and supports scientific evidence dissemination in clinical practice.

== History and activities ==
The organisation was founded in 2002 following an initiative of the Belgian federal government to promote the integration of evidence-based medicine into healthcare policy and clinical practice. The organisation's director is Patrik Vankrunkelsven, who is also one of its founders. CEBAM operates as an inter-university centre and collaborates with several organisations involved in evidence-based healthcare in Belgium. These activities include methodological training, validation of clinical practice guidelines, and support for the development of systematic reviews.

== Digital resources ==
=== CEBAM Digital Library for Health (CDLH) ===
One of CEBAM’s main projects is the CEBAM Digital Library for Health (CDLH), an electronic medical library that provides healthcare professionals with access to scientific literature and clinical resources relevant to evidence-based practice, specifically access to clinical practice guidelines, systematic reviews like those in the Cochrane Library, biomedical databases including MEDLINE, and major international medical journals. The platform was developed in collaboration with the Belgian National Institute for Health and Disability Insurance to make reliable medical information accessible to healthcare professionals without university library access.

=== Public health information initiatives ===
In 2013, CEBAM developed the website Gezondheid en Wetenschap (“Health and Science”) at the request of the Flemish Minister for Welfare, Jo Vandeurzen. The website provides independent and scientifically verified health information for the general public in Flanders In April 2023, the organisation launched the mobile application ZoekGezond, which provides access to the same evidence-based health information as the website.

== Role in Belgium healthcare system ==
CEBAM forms part of a broader network of Belgian institutions that promote evidence-based healthcare. These include organisations involved in guideline development, dissemination of scientific evidence, and healthcare policy.
