= Sciensano =

Belgian national institute

Coordinates: 50.824308°N 4.381724°E

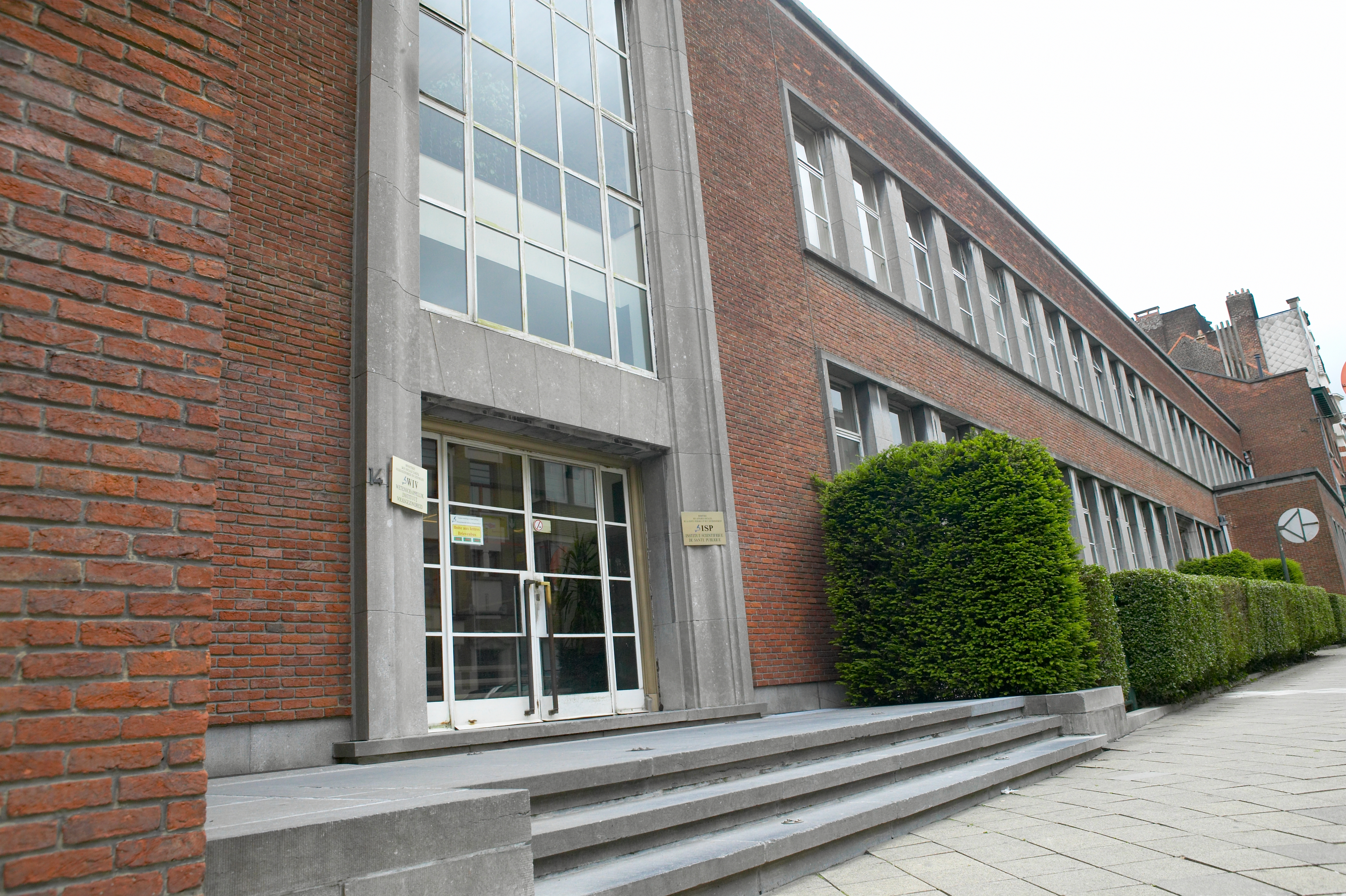
- Headquarters of Sciensano in Ixelles
- Motto: Healthy all life long
- Established: 1 April 2018; 8 years ago
- Field of research: Public health Animal health Food safety
- Directors: Pierre Kerkhofs (ad interim anno 2018); Myriam Sneyers (ad interim anno 2018)
- Staff: Ca. 700 employees
- Location: Ixelles (Brussels), Belgium
- Nobel laureates: Jules Bordet
- Website: www.sciensano.be
- Location within Belgium

Sciensano is a research institute and the national public health institute of Belgium. It is a so-called federal scientific institution that operates under the authority of the federal minister of Public Health and the federal minister of Agriculture of Belgium. Sciensano's core business is scientific research in the fields of public health, animal health and food safety. Sciensano arose in 2018 from the merger of the former Veterinary and Agrochemical Research Centre (in Dutch: Centrum voor Onderzoek in Diergeneeskunde en Agrochemie, in French: Centre d’Étude et de Recherches Vétérinaires et Agrochimiques, often shortened to CODA-CERVA) and the former Scientific Institute of Public Health (in Dutch: Wetenschappelijk Instituut Volksgezondheid, in French: Institut Scientifique de Santé Publique, often shortened to WIV-ISP). Both institutions were merged because of their complementary activities and to be able to provide a comprehensive answer to the health challenges of the future. More particularly, the merger was based on the One Health principle that states that the areas of human health, animal health and the environment are inherently connected with each other. The merger became official on April 1, 2018.

== Activities ==
- Environmental health: Sciensano researches and monitors environmental health and environmental threats to human health. For example, it assesses the risks posed to biosafety by genetically modified organisms (GMOs) and develops environmental indicators for a healthier and more environmentally friendly pesticide use. It also investigates the health impact of air pollution.
- Food consumption and food safety: Sciensano analyses the dietary habits of the population and whether they meet the dietary recommendations. It also investigates the presence and impact of GMOs, food pathogens, food contaminants, pesticide residues, food additives, nanomaterials and other materials that come into contact with food.
- Health and disease monitoring: through different methods, such as nationwide surveys, disease registries and networks of collaborating physicians, Sciensano collects data about the health of the population, for example about disabilities or medication consumption. This data allows health authorities to evaluate and adjust health policy. It also follows up on the epidemiology of infectious diseases such as AIDS, influenza, salmonella and bronchitis, of zoonoses such as brucellosis and rabies and of chronic diseases that are linked to wealth, such as cardiovascular disease, cancer and diabetes. This allows Sciensano to detect and evaluate threats, and to support health authorities in their fight against these diseases.
- Quality of health care: together with the Belgian Health Care Knowledge Centre and the National Institute for Health and Disability Insurance, Sciensano evaluates the quality of the Belgian health care system. For this purpose, it makes use of health indicators, coordinates national databases, keeps track of hospital-acquired infections, makes complex medical diagnoses as a scientific reference authority, and more. Sciensano's end goal is to improve the quality of health care and patient outcomes.
- Vaccines, medications and health products: Sciensano supports the Belgian Federal Agency for Medicines and Health Products by assessing the safety and effectiveness of vaccines, medications and other health products. For example, it performs quality control on medications and vaccines, investigates illegal and counterfeit medications and researches antibiotic resistance. In addition, Sciensano analyses samples of certain illegal drugs within the framework of the Belgian Early Warning System Drugs.
- Quality of medical laboratories: Sciensano is responsible for the inspection and certification of medical laboratories in Belgium, especially with regard to samples of human origin. It supervises the correct handling of sample material and the use of standardised analytical methods, and provides external quality assurance.
- Animal health: Sciensano supports the Belgian Federal Agency for the Safety of the Food Chain, the Federal Public Service Public Health, Food Chain Safety and Environment and front-line organisations in their tasks related to animal health and food safety. To this end, it monitors zoonoses as well as epizootics for the impact they may have on human health through the food chain as well as purely for their socio-economical impact on animal husbandry.
