= H10 =

H10 or H-10 may refer to:

== Transportation ==
- Atlas H-10, a 1948 four-seat cabin monoplane aircraft
- HMS Encounter (H10), a 1934 British Royal Navy E class destroyer
- HMS H10, a 1915 British Royal Navy H class submarine
- PRR H10, a 1916 American 2-8-0 steam locomotives model
- H10 Bletcham Way, UK Road
- London Buses route H10
- Lioré et Olivier LeO H-10, a French seaplane

== Other ==
- Haplogroup H10 (mtDNA), a subclade of human mtDNA Haplogroup H (mtDNA)
- Hilbert's tenth problem in mathematics
- H10 Hotels, a Spanish hotel chain
- iriver H10 series, a series of portable digital audio players
- DSC-H10, a 2008 Sony Cyber-shot H series camera
- H-10, refrigerant leak detector from Bacharach
