= Manhunt for Jürgen Conings =

Manhunt for a Belgian soldier

- Part of Counter-terrorism operations in Belgium
- Location: several locations, including Hoge Kempen National Park
- Planned by: Federal Police; Belgian Armed Forces
- Target: Jürgen Conings
- Date: 17 May – 20 June 2021
- Outcome: Body of Jürgen Conings found

The manhunt for Jürgen Conings (Dutch pronunciation: [ˈjyːrɣə(ŋ) ˈkoːnɪŋs]) began on 18 May 2021, after the discovery that Conings, a Belgian soldier under suspicion of far-right extremism, had taken several weapons from military barracks in Leopoldsburg the previous day and farewell letters were found containing violent threats directed at the Belgian government and virologists (relating to the ongoing COVID-19 pandemic). On 20 June 2021, Belgian media reported that a body had been found in the Dilserbos forest, which was later confirmed by the Federal Prosecutor's Office to be the body of Jürgen Conings. One day later, the Federal Prosecutor's Office confirmed that Conings died of suicide by gunshot, which was disputed by his family. A second autopsy was denied and he was cremated a few days later.

== Jürgen Conings ==
Jürgen Conings (28 September 1974 in Maaseik – May or June 2021 in Dilsen-Stokkem) was a corporal in the Belgian Air Component and shooting instructor. He was a former elite soldier and experienced sniper. Over the course of his career, he took part in eleven foreign missions in Yugoslavia, Bosnia, Kosovo, Lebanon, Iraq, and Afghanistan.

Several colleagues of Conings declared that he held far-right ideas, and had threatened Marc Van Ranst, a Belgian virologist. Until the end of 2020, Conings was a member of the right-wing populist party Vlaams Belang. Because of his politically left-leaning ideas and presence on social media, Van Ranst is often targeted by right-wing and COVID-19 skeptics. Conings received two disciplinary sanctions because of his threats to Van Ranst in 2020. Therefore, he was demoted to weapon bearer, which secured him access to the armory. After his threats, his name was added to the CUTA list of the Coordination Unit for Threat Analysis, which features Muslim extremists and far-right and far-left individuals.

== Manhunt ==
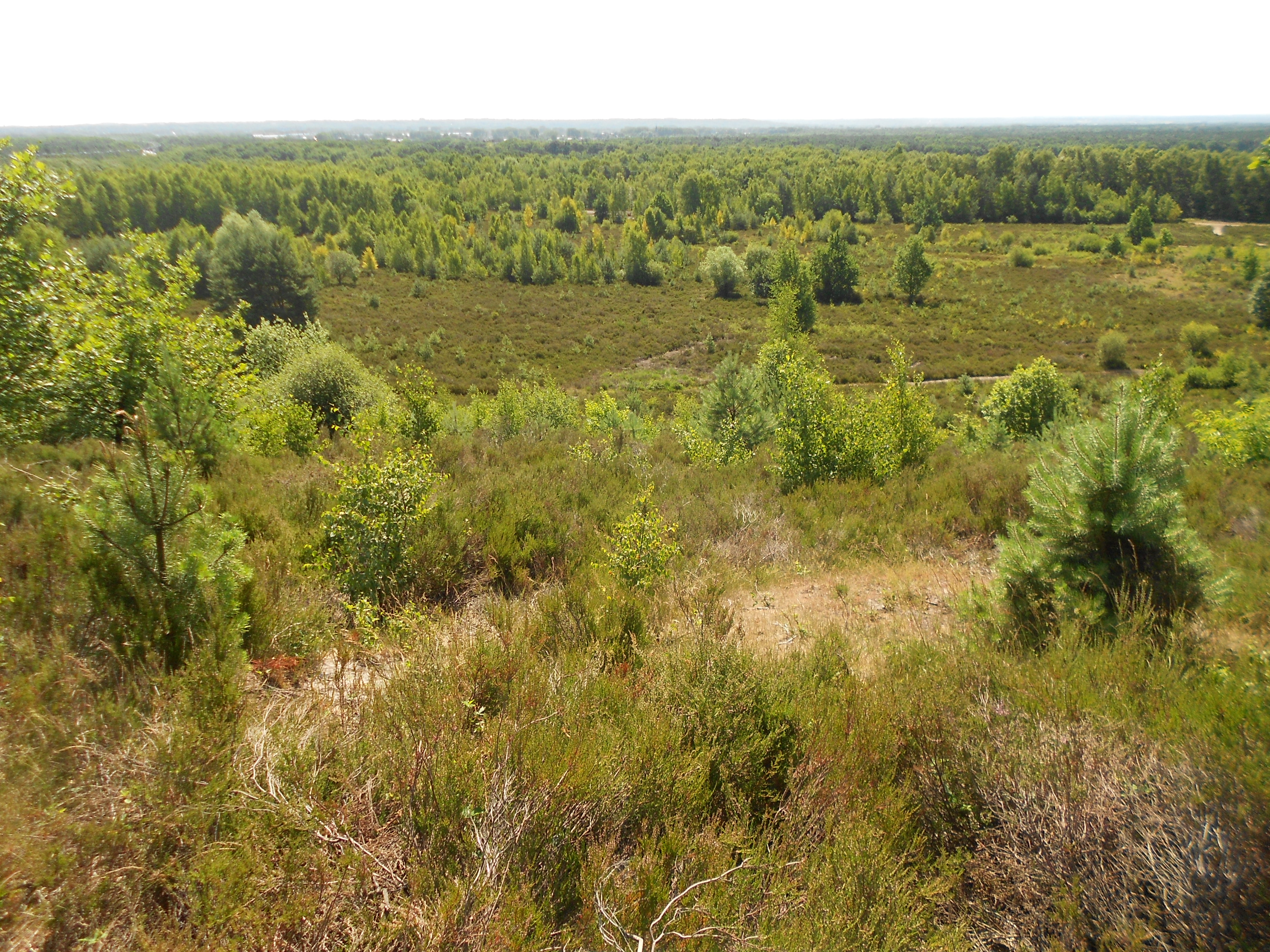
Hoge Kempen National Park

On 17 May 2021, Conings left three farewell letters, stating he would resist the Belgian government's COVID-19 containment measures. He threatened to attack, among others, the government, the army, and virologists. That day, without alerting the intelligence services and military leaders, he loaded his Audi Q5 with four M72 LAW rocket launchers. He also took with him an automatic FN P90 personal defence weapon, and a semi-automatic FN 5.7 pistol and over 2000 5.7x28 rounds of ammunition cartridges. For two hours, he scouted the surroundings of the private residence of Marc Van Ranst and his family. Van Ranst and his family were moved to a safe house during the manhunt.

On 18 May, he left his military decorations on the grave of his parents in Peer. The Belgian military was alerted of his disappearance and started a manhunt. The same day, his abandoned Audi Q5 car was found by the federal police in Dilsen-Stokkem near Hoge Kempen National Park. Four rocket launchers were retrieved from the car, which had been boobytrapped. The authorities believed he was hiding in the national park, heavily armed. From 19 to 23 May, the national park was closed down for the manhunt. The Belgian army conducted several sweeps of the park, to no avail. They were supported by the German federal police's counter-terrorism unit GSG 9 as well as Dutch and Luxembourgish police forces.

On 20 May, the federal prosecutor's office started a judicial investigation against Conings for "attempted murder and illegal possession of firearms in a terrorist context." On 22 May, Conings' name was added to the Interpol red notice list.

The federal police performed several searches on 22 May, including the house of Conings, Tomas Boutens, and other residences of far-right individuals.

On 27 May, 400 police agents and soldiers carried out an additional search at the Hoge Kempen national park. A small part of the national park was closed off to the general public. The federal prosecutor's office declared that there were no indications that Conings has died. The operation constituted a targeted search, as opposed to previous general sweeps of the national park. Another limited search was carried out on 29 May in Lanklaar, part of the municipality of Dilsen-Stokkem. Around 20 police and military vehicles were used, as well as one police helicopter.

On 9 June, after a search around the area of Conings' abandoned car, a backpack filled with ammunition and most likely owned by Conings was found in the vicinity of the car. Some of the ammunition found in the backpack matched the firearms stolen by Conings, but there was also ammunition for a shotgun, raising concerns that he had more weapons in his possession than suspected. Media reported that by 16 June the Belgian Armed Forces had spent over €650,000 on the manhunt, with most of the cost being for materials and fuel but also including bonuses paid to soldiers mobilised for weekend searches.

== Finding of the body and autopsy ==
On 20 June, mayor of Maaseik Johan Tollenaere noticed the smell of a decaying body at the Dilserbos forest, near the spot where Conings' abandoned car was found. Without conducting a search for a possible human body, he alerted the local police, who subsequently found a body. Before Tollenaere alerted the police, a local hunter noticed the same smell and searched the area for a body. He later declared to the press that he tripped over a foot of the body. Sources by the federal police and Federal Prosecutor's Office confirmed that the body was Jürgen Conings' body. The same day, virologist Marc Van Ranst returned to his home after his stay at a safe house for the duration of the manhunt.

According to the autopsy the cause of death was suicide by gunshot. Conings' family sent a bailiff to the funeral parlour to prevent the cremation of his body and demanded a second autopsy. A judge decided, however, that the showing of Conings' body was not necessary. In addition, the funeral director received death threats from unknown sources.

== Political reactions and consequences ==
Prime Minister Alexander De Croo called it unacceptable that someone considered dangerous has access to weapons. Minister of Defence Ludivine Dedonder emphasised the need for measures. She was criticised by the opposition since she was already questioned about right extremism in the army one month before. During a press conference on 25 May, Dedonder admitted together with Chief of Defence Michel Hofman that mistakes were made in the case of Conings and that they were being examined.

On 16 June, the Chamber of Representatives discussed the report by Dedonder regarding the Conings case. While the report was leaked before, it was initially not handed over to the members of parliament. The meeting was therefore postponed until 5 PM, when members had the opportunity to access the report. Dedonder commented on the report during the meeting, stating that there was "a structural understaffing at different services on all levels, a significant staff turnover, loss of knowledge and experience, limited supervision at Conings' final unit, Coronavirus measures, insufficient circulation of information, a new and complex structure and internal staffing problems at the military intelligence service, insufficient exchange of information within defence and between the different security services." Moreover, she identified a lack of a clear policy with regard to extremism within the army.

== Support ==
Conings could count on the support of several far-right people and organisations. Far-right terrorist Tomas Boutens knew Conings and expressed his support. A Facebook group called Als 1 achter Jürgen (As 1 behind Jürgen) was started on 20 May as a support group for Conings, and gained nearly 11,500 members in its first 24 hours. After gaining almost 45,800 members, Facebook removed the group on 25 May, specifying that "pages which praise or support terrorists, like Jürgen Conings, are not allowed on Facebook or Instagram."

In Maasmechelen, close to Hoge Kempen national park, a "March for Jürgen" was held, attracting about 150 participants. One participant was filmed doing the Nazi salute. On 23 May, about 200 people participated in a second "March for Jürgen". On 24 May, when the national park was reopened, a walk was organised in the area of heathland known as Mechelse Heide, part of the national park, in support of Conings, which attracted 100 participants.

On the evening of 20 June, the day of the discovery of Conings' body, about 140 sympathisers held a vigil for Conings. In the presence of several members of the Conings family, the attendees went from a park in Dilsen-Stokkem to Jürgen Conings' home, where they laid flowers and lit candles.

The manhunt for Conings has given rise to several unproven and debunked conspiracy theories among his supporters, including the belief that Conings was killed by the government.
