= National Institute for Health and Disability Insurance =

Federal public body of social security in Belgium

- In Dutch: Rijksinstituut voor Ziekte- en Invaliditeitsverzekering (RIZIV); In French: Institut National d'Assurance Maladie-Invalidité'' (INAMI); In German: Landesinstitut für Kranken- und Invalidenversicherung (LIKIV)
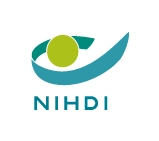
- NIHDI

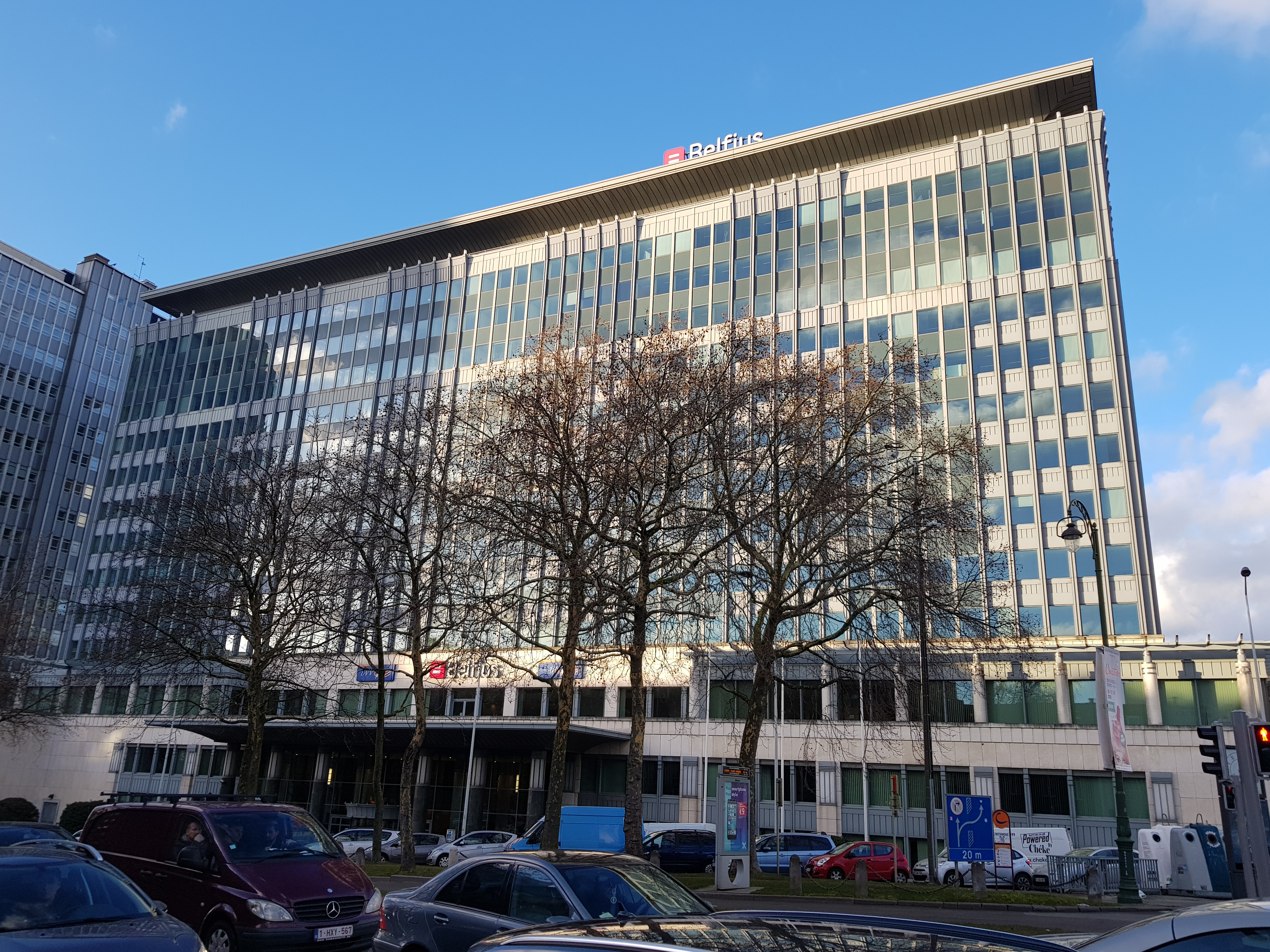

Institute overview
- Formed: January 1, 1964; 62 years ago
- Jurisdiction: Belgium
- Headquarters: Saint-Josse-ten-Noode, Brussels; 50.8530973°N 4.3682282°E
- Annual budget: 37,175,106,000 EUR (2017)
- Minister responsible: Frank Vandenbroucke (politician), Federal Minister of Social Affairs and Public Health
- Institute executives: Pedro Facon, General manager (01/01/2026); Laurent Guinotte, Deputy general manager (28/09/2026)
- Parent department: Federal Public Service Social Security
- Parent Institute: National Office for Social Security
- Website: www.nihdi.fgov.be

The National Institute for Health and Disability Insurance (NIHDI) is a federal public body of social security in Belgium. Under the authority of the Belgian federal minister of Social Affairs and Public Health, it is responsible for administering the country's compulsory national schemes for health insurance and disability benefits, and manages a compensation fund for medical accidents.

== Organisation ==
The institute was founded by the law of August 9, 1963 establishing and organizing a scheme for compulsory insurance for medical treatment and benefits, which came into force on January 1, 1964. The law of 1963 has since been replaced by the law of July 14, 1994 regarding the compulsory insurance for medical treatment and benefits coordinated on July 14, 1994.

The institute's health and disability insurance budget for 2017 amounted to more than 37 billion euros.

== Activities ==
- Health insurance: the NIHDI makes rules concerning the reimbursement of costs for health services and establishes standard prices. It manages and allocates the national budget for health reimbursements. The effective reimbursement of health service costs to patients is done by the different health insurance organisations that exist in Belgium (called mutualities). The NIHDI also inspects the correct application of reimbursement rules.
- Disability benefits: the NIHDI makes rules about the conditions required to receive benefits in case of labour incapacity caused by illness or injury, motherhood, fatherhood or adoption, establishes the amount of those benefits, and manages the financial support to incapacitated persons who want to start working again. It also combats disability fraud (a form of welfare fraud) by for example checking whether people receiving disability benefits are not working and secretly receiving a wage. Just as with health reimbursements, the effective payment of benefits to entitled people is done by the mutualities.
- Medical accidents: the NIHDI manages the Fund for Medical Accidents and examines whether victims of a medical accident have a right to compensation from the fund. The NIHDI also advises, mediates, registers and reports in cases of medical accidents.

== See also ==
- Belgian Health Care Knowledge Centre
- Healthcare in Belgium
- Federal Public Service Public Health, Food Chain Safety and Environment
- Sciensano
- Belgian Centre for Evidence-Based Medicine (CEBAM)
