= Department of Welfare, Public Health and Family (Flanders) =

- Departement Welzijn, Volksgezondheid en Gezin (in Dutch)

Department overview
- Jurisdiction: Flemish Community
- Headquarters: Ellipse Building; King Albert II Lane 35; 1030 Schaerbeek; 50.862685°N 4.359170°E
- Minister responsible: Jo Vandeurzen, Minister of Welfare, Public Health and Family
- Website: www.departementwvg.be

Footnotes
- "Department of Welfare, Public Health and Family" is the official English translation according to the Information Agency of the Flemish Government.

The Department of Welfare, Public Health and Family (in Dutch: Departement Welzijn, Volksgezondheid en Gezin) is a department of the Flemish Government. The Flemish Government is the executive branch of the Flemish Community of Belgium. The department is a part of the so-called Welfare, Public Health and Family policy area, which consists of the department and a few associated agencies. The minister responsible for the department is the minister of Welfare, Public Health and Family of the Flemish Government. The current minister in the Bourgeois Government, which assumed office in 2014, is Jo Vandeurzen of the Christian Democratic and Flemish party. The department itself is led by a secretary-general. The department consists of nine divisions, of which the services of the secretary-general form one. Two of those divisions also form the Care Inspectorate, which inspects all health and welfare services and establishments that are recognised, licensed or subsidised by the department or any agency associated with it.

The department is, amongst other things, responsible for the preparation and follow-up of public policy concerning welfare, public health and family matters, for the recognition, licensing, subsidising and inspection of various health and welfare services and establishments, and for the follow-up and counseling of offenders and victims of crime on behalf of the judiciary or other authorities.

== Policy area ==
Since its reform in 2006, the Flemish public administration has been divided into a number of so-called policy areas. Every policy area consists of a department, a strategic advisory council, a number of agencies and some other entities. A policy area is led by a minister. The agencies in a policy area can have different legal statuses: they are either internally autonomous agencies or externally autonomous agencies. Internally autonomous agencies are directly led by their minister, whilst externally autonomous agencies are led by a board of directors. Internally autonomous agencies can be further divided in those with legal personality and those without. Those without legal personality have to enter contracts under the name of the Flemish Community or the Flemish Region. Externally autonomous agencies can be divided in those that are incorporated under public law and those that are incorporated under private law. The latter often have the form of a non-profit, a foundation or a company. Sometimes, the whole of the department and the internally autonomous agencies without legal personality is referred to as the ministry.

As of 2018, the Welfare, Public Health and Family policy area consists of the following of these kinds of entities:

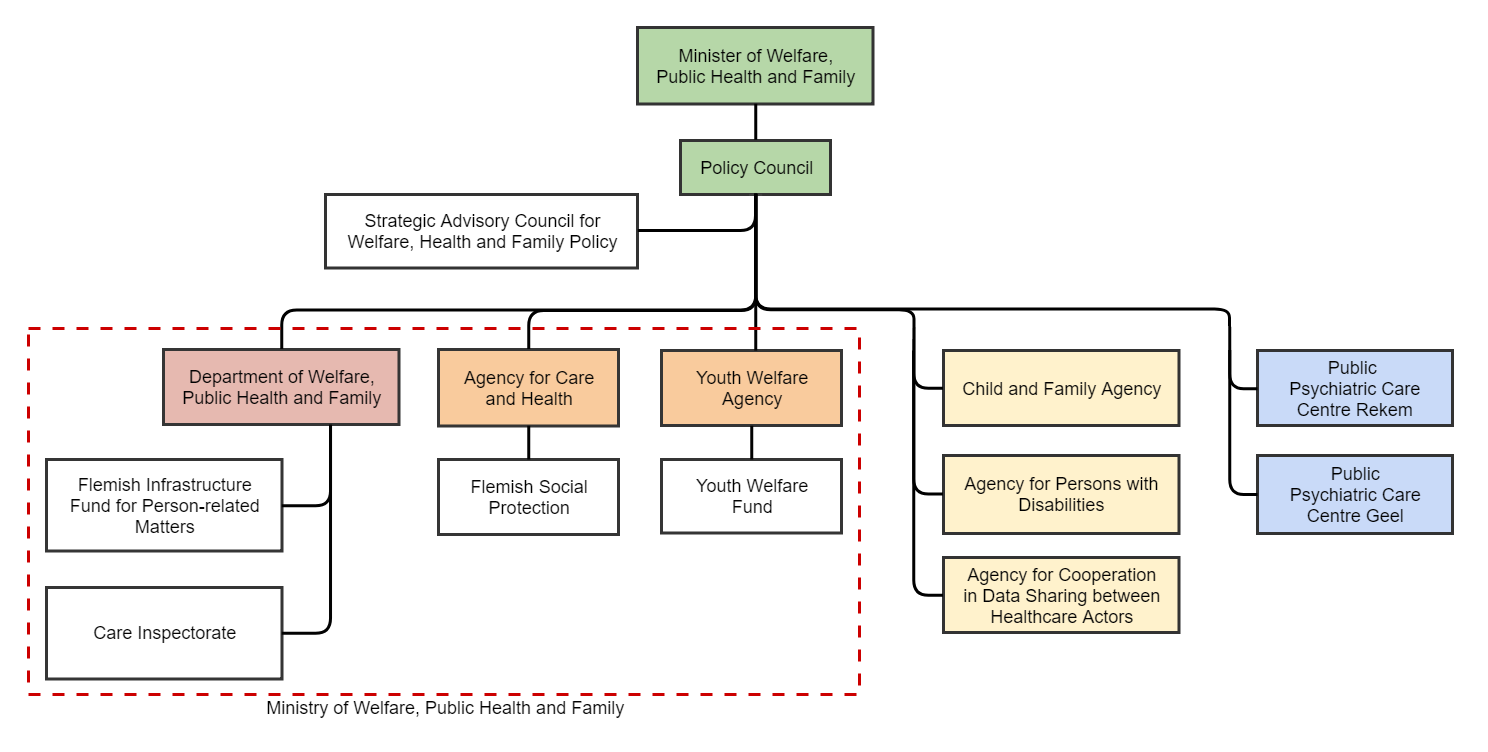

Policy deciders
Department
Internally autonomous agencies without legal personality
Internally autonomous agencies with legal personality
Externally autonomous agencies under public law

== See also ==
- Federal Public Service Health (Belgium)
- Healthcare in Belgium
