= Federal Public Service Social Security =

FPS Social Security
- Federal Public Service Social Security
- The organisation's logo in German
- Formation: 23 May 2001; 25 years ago

The FPS Social Security (Flemish: Federale Overheidsdienst Sociale Zekerheid, Walloon: Service public fédéral Sécurité sociale, German: Föderaler Öffentlicher Dienst Soziale Sicherheit) is a Federal Public Service of Belgium. It was created by Royal Order on 23 May 2001, as part of the plans of the Verhofstadt I Government to modernise the federal administration.

The FPS Social Security is responsible for the Belgian system of social security.

== Organisation ==
The FPS Social Security is currently organised into five Directorates-General:

- The Directorate-General for Social Policy
- The Directorate-General for Self-employed Persons
- The Directorate-General for Disabled Persons
- The Directorate-General for War Victims
- The Directorate-General for Social Inspection

In addition, it is also responsible for a large number of public social security institutions, such as the National Office for Social Security, the National Institute for the Social Security of the Self-employed, the National Institute for Health and Disability Insurance, the National Office for Pensions and the National Employment Office.
