= International School Ghent =

Coordinates: 51°02′11.91″N 3°43′33.38″E

- Leopoldskazerne, Gaspar De Craeyerstraat 2 Ghent; Belgium

Information
- Type: Private school
- Established: 2011
- Website: www.isg-ghent.org

The International School Ghent is an English-language international school that provides an international education to students aged 3 to 16.

== History ==
The International School Ghent was established in 2011 and first opened its doors in September 2012 with six teachers. The school was established to provide an international school education modeled on the International Primary Curriculum for children of expatriates, foreign employees in Belgium as well as Belgians who have an interest in providing international education to their children.

== Education ==
Classes are taught in English and are currently offered in two streams: Pre-primary education and Grades 1 to 6. The school also provides Dutch language lessons and French language lessons for students beginning in grades 5 and 6. The school has plans to add a middle school and high school program for Grades 7 to 12 in future years.

== Partners ==
The International School Ghent reports to a board of directors which has representatives from its four founding member organisations:

- Barco N.V.
- Vlaams Instituut voor Biotechnologie (Flanders Institute for Biotechnology)
- Ghent University
- Volvo Cars (Volvo Cars Ghent)

The Board of Directors also has representatives from:

- City of Ghent
- VOKA

The International School Ghent also receives support from staff of its partner school De Kleine Icarus, from the Hogeschool Gent (University College Ghent)'s teacher training departments as well as from Deloitte and ING.
