= Care Inspectorate (Flanders) =

- Zorginspectie (in Dutch)

Inspectorate overview
- Formed: January 1, 2015
- Jurisdiction: Flemish Community
- Headquarters: Ellipse Building; King Albert II Lane 35; 1030 Schaerbeek; 50.862685°N 4.359170°E
- Employees: Around 90
- Minister responsible: Jo Vandeurzen, Minister of Welfare, Public Health and Family
- Parent department: Department of Welfare, Public Health and Family
- Website: www.departementwvg.be

Footnotes
- "Care Inspectorate" is the official English translation according to the Flanders Information Agency.

The Flemish Care Inspectorate (in Dutch: Zorginspectie) is a part of the Department of Welfare, Public Health and Family of the Flemish Government. The Flemish Government is the executive branch of the Flemish Community of Belgium. In Belgium, the Communities are responsible for the inspection of health and welfare services and establishments. The Care Inspectorate consists of two complementary divisions of the department: one for the inspection of services for disabled people and child care services, and one for the inspection of welfare services, health services (such as hospitals) and financial matters. Together, they inspect all services and establishments in these domains that are recognised, licensed or subsidised by the department or any agency associated with it. The Care Inspectorate also inspects disabled people who receive a so-called personal assistance budget or financial compensation for assistive tools.

Anno 2018, the Care Inspectorate has a staff of around 90 people, including about 70 inspectors. In 2017, the Care Inspectorate conducted 4,678 inspections, about half of which were of child care services. Of these 4,678 inspections, 401 were conducted after a complaint was made with the Care Inspectorate.

== History ==
The predecessor to the current Care Inspectorate was officially founded on 1 April 2006, when the inspection services of the Flemish Child and Family Agency, the Flemish Agency for Persons with Disabilities, the Flemish Family and Social Welfare Administration, and the Flemish Health Care Administration were merged. The merger took place during the then-ongoing reorganisation of the Flemish administration. The newly found inspection service was given the status of an internally autonomous agency. A few years later, the agency was renamed as the "Care Inspectorate".

Under the Bourgeois Government, which assumed office in 2014, the Care Inspectorate was merged with the Department of Welfare, Public Health and Family. As of 1 January 2015, the Care Inspectorate consists of two divisions of the department.

== Inspection reports ==
Under local open records laws, anyone has a right to access the inspection reports made by the Care Inspectorate without having to give a reason. This is referred to as passive openness. In some cases, however, the Care Inspectorate can withhold (a part of) an inspection report from the public, for example when the report is not finished yet, or in order to protect the privacy of individuals. Since 2015, the Care Inspectorate also exercises what is referred to as active openness. This means the Care Inspectorate actively works to make its reports public on its website. Aside from inspection reports, the public can also consult the results of quality assessments of hospitals that participate in the so-called Flemish Indicator Project for Patients and Professionals (shortened to VIP² in Dutch) on a separate website. These quality assessments are about breast cancer treatment or patient experiences, for example.

== See also ==
- Dutch Health Care Inspectorate
- Healthcare in Belgium
