= Kinetic capillary electrophoresis =

Kinetic capillary electrophoresis or KCE is capillary electrophoresis of molecules that interact during electrophoresis.

KCE was introduced and developed by Professor Sergey Krylov and his research group at York University, Toronto, Canada. It serves as a conceptual platform for development of homogeneous chemical affinity methods for studies of molecular interactions (measurements of binding and rate constants) and affinity purification (purification of known molecules and search for unknown molecules). Different KCE methods are designed by varying initial and boundary conditions – the way interacting molecules enter and exit the capillary. Several KCE methods were described: non-equilibrium capillary electrophoresis of the equilibrium mixtures (NECEEM), sweeping capillary electrophoresis (SweepCE), and plug-plug KCE (ppKCE).
