= H10 Hotels =

International hotel chain

- Company type: Limited Company
- Industry: Hotel and catering trade
- Headquarters: Barcelona, Spain
- Products: Hotels
- Number of employees: 5,500 approx.

H10 Hotels is a hotel chain with head offices in Barcelona that has been in operation since the late 1980s when its founder, Josep Espelt, opened his first hotel on the Costa Daurada. The chain has over 63 hotels in 22 destinations, most of them owned by the company, offering more than 16,000 rooms.

H10 Hotels is a hotel chain with 51 locations within Spain, and internationally, where it has twelve establishments. At the international level, the chain aims to continue its expansion in the capital cities of Europe, where it already has hotels in Rome, London, Venice and Berlin, in addition to the Caribbean, with establishments in Punta Cana, Riviera Maya and Jamaica.

== Locations ==
- Barcelona
- Madrid
- Seville
- Salou
- Cordoba
- Tarragona
- Rome
- Venice
- London
- Berlin
- Lisbon
- Tenerife
- Lanzarote
- Fuerteventura
- La Palma
- Gran Canaria
- Mallorca
- Costa del Sol
- Costa Daurada
- Costa Blanca
- Riviera Maya
- Punta Cana
- Jamaica
- Benidorm
