= Federal Agency for Medicines and Health Products =

Coordinates: 50°50′10″N 4°20′00″E

- Federaal Agentschap voor Geneesmiddelen en Gezondheidsproducten (Dutch); Agence fédérale des médicaments et des produits de santé (French)

Agency overview
- Formed: January 1, 2007
- Preceding agency: Directorate-general for Medicines (Federal Public Service Health)
- Jurisdiction: Belgium
- Headquarters: Saint-Gilles, Brussels
- Employees: 458 (anno 2016)
- Annual budget: Ca. 70,000,000 EUR
- Minister responsible: Frank Vandenbroucke, Minister of Public Health
- Agency executive: Hugues Malonne, Administrator-general
- Parent department: Federal Public Service Health
- Website: www.famhp.be

The Federal Agency for Medicines and Health Products (FAMHP) (Dutch: Federaal Agentschap voor Geneesmiddelen en Gezondheidsproducten, FAGG, French: Agence fédérale des médicaments et des produits de santé, AFMPS) of Belgium is responsible for the approval and registration of new medication in Belgium and for pharmacovigilance. Hugues Malonne is the CEO of the agency.

The agency succeeded the Directoraat-generaal Geneesmiddelen / Direction Générale des Médicaments of the Federal Public Service Health as the new Competent Authority on 1 January 2007.

== See also ==
- European Medicines Agency (Europe)
- Food and Drug Administration (USA)
