= Marc Van Ranst =

Belgian public health doctor and Professor of Virology

- Born: 20 June 1965 (age 61); Bornem, Belgium
- Education: KU Leuven; Albert Einstein College of Medicine
- Scientific career
- Fields: Virology
- Workplaces: KU Leuven

Marc Van Ranst (born 20 June 1965) is a Belgian public health physician and Professor of Virology at the Katholieke Universiteit Leuven (Leuven, Belgium) and the Rega Institute for Medical Research. On 1 May 2007, he was appointed as Interministerial comissionar by the Federal Government of Belgium to prepare Belgium for an influenza pandemic.

== Education ==
Van Ranst obtained a BA in medicine at Hasselt University (then L.U.C.) in 1986 and later graduated as a physician at the Katholieke Universiteit Leuven in 1990. From 1990 to 1993, he worked at the Department of Microbiology and Immunology at Albert Einstein College of Medicine in New York, and received his PhD degree in virology in 1994. He also specialized in laboratory medicine for which he obtained a PhD from the Katholieke Universiteit Leuven in 1998.

== Career ==
=== Academic career ===
He started working at the University Hospitals Leuven in 1999 and became Professor of Virology at the K.U. Leuven. Currently, he is associate chief of the department of laboratory medicine, and heads the diagnostic virology laboratory at the University Hospitals Leuven, Belgium. He is also the director of the AIDS reference laboratory and of the national coronavirus and rotavirus reference laboratories. Professor Van Ranst was appointed in 1999 to the Belgian high council for public health, where he heads the vaccination department. Since 2012, he is the Chairman of the Department of Microbiology and Immunology at the KU Leuven. In his research laboratory, six PhD students and four MSc students are currently working on studies on the molecular evolution of DNA and RNA viruses.

=== Teaching ===
Professor Van Ranst teaches virology and computational genomics at the Faculty of Medicine at the KU Leuven. Since 1995, he holds an affiliate academic position at the Faculty of Natural Sciences at Charles University in Prague, where he teaches Bioinformatics.

=== Science communication ===
He published over 270 scientific papers in peer reviewed journals and contributed eight chapters to books on molecular evolution and bioinformatics.

Marc Van Ranst is the chairman of the editorial board of VacciNews.net, a social media platform that provides information on vaccines.

=== Awards ===
- 2004: European Clinical Virology Heine-Medin award of the European Society for Clinical Virology
- 2005: doctor honoris causa degree at the University of Kalmar in Sweden
- 2022: doctor honoris causa degree at the Vrije Universiteit Amsterdam and Leiden University

== Lead in Belgian influenza crisis management ==
Van Ranst has been responsible for influenza pandemic preparedness planning since 2007 onwards. In 2009-10 he was an interministerial commissary for crisis management during the Mexican flu pandemic In 2020, during the COVID-19 pandemic, Marc Van Ranst became a member both of the Belgian 'Risk Assessment Group' (RAG), which analyses the risks of coronavirus SARS-CoV-2 for public health, and of the 'Scientific committee Coronavirus' which advises Belgian health authorities on combatting the virus and which makes prognoses on its evolution and spread in Belgium.

== Social media ==
Van Ranst is very active on social media, particularly Twitter, where he addresses both professional and societal issues. In August 2014, he was the first person who used the term Gazacaust that created heavy reactions in the Jewish community in Belgium and abroad.

Van Ranst is also a target of social media campaigns by right-wing Flemish nationalists in Belgium. In 2018 former migration minister Theo Francken nick-named Van Ranst as Doctor Hatred. In May 2021, a far-right extremist, identified as soldier Jürgen Conings, threatened Van Ranst. The suspect was heavily armed and considered as a serious threat. Four rocket launchers were found in his car. Authorities launched a manhunt in Dilsen-Stokkem, Limburg, Belgium. Van Ranst and his family had to be moved to a safe house until Conings was found dead on 20 June.

== Works ==
- Van Ranst, M. (2004). "Chandipura virus: an emerging human pathogen?". The Lancet. 364 (9437): 821–2. doi:10.1016/S0140-6736(04)16995-X. PMC 7134742. PMID 15351172.; 2004 September 4–10

== Sources ==
- Prof. Marc Van Ranst over vogelgriep in Turkije (Dutch)
- Viroloog Van Ranst wordt interministerieel commissaris influenza (Dutch)
- VacciNewsNet
