= Federal Public Service Health =

The FPS Public Health, Food Chain Safety and Environment (Dutch: FOD Volksgezondheid, Veiligheid van de Voedselketen en Leefmilieu, French: SPF Santé publique, Sécurité de la Chaîne alimentaire et Environnement, German: FÖD Volksgesundheit, Sicherheit der Nahrungsmittelkette und Umwelt), more commonly known as the FPS Health, is a Federal Public Service of Belgium. Royal Order established FPS Justice on 23 May 2001, as part of Verhofstadt I Government to rebuild the federal administration.

It is responsible for guaranteeing the public health, the safety of the food chain and a safe environment.

== Organisation ==
The FPS Health is currently organised into three Directorates-General and an Administration:

- The Directorate-General for Health Care
- The Directorate-General for Animals, Plants and Foodstuffs
- The Directorate-General for Environment
- The Administration of Medical Expertise (Medex)

The former Directorate-General for Medicinal Products has become the autonomous Federal Agency for Medicines and Health Products in 2007. The Directorate-General for Health Care is the result of the merger of the Directorate-General for Health Care Facilities Organisation and the Directorate-General for Primary Health Care & Crisis Management. The FPS Health is also linked with two scientific institutions:

- Sciensano, the successor to the former Center for Veterinary and Agrochemical Research and the former Scientific Institute of Public Health
- The Superior Health Council

== See also ==
- National Institute for Health and Disability Insurance
