= Legal recognition =

Legal recognition of a status or fact in a jurisdiction is a formal acknowledgment of it as being true, valid, legal, or worthy of consideration, and may involve approval or the granting of rights.

For example, a nation or territory may require a person to hold a professional qualification to practice an occupation, such as medicine. While any establishment may grant a qualification, only recognized qualifications from recognized establishments entitle the holder to practice the restricted occupation. Qualifications from another jurisdiction may or may not be recognized. This way, the state controls and regulates access; for example, physicians of unknown competence may not practice, and it may be desired to protect the employment of local people.

Another example is that any person can undergo a form of marriage with anyone or anything, and claim to be married. However, a marriage that is recognized affords the participant certain rights and obligations, e.g., a possible reduction in taxes, an obligation not to abandon the spouse, etc. Hypothetically, a person who claims to be married to a horse has no rights and no obligations and is subject to legal sanctions for any attempt to practice what would be conjugal rights if marriage was recognized. In the early twenty-first century, there was much controversy about recognizing marriages between couples of the same sex.

Article 16 of the International Covenant on Civil and Political Rights affords the right to be recognized everywhere as a person before the law. The derogation of this right this is prohibited, even during the proclamation of public emergencies that threaten the life of the nation.

Legal recognition varies between jurisdictions. A person may be recognized as a physician, and to have been married and divorced in one jurisdiction; upon moving to another jurisdiction, some or all of these statuses may not be recognized. The new jurisdiction, while not recognizing the medical qualification as such, may allow it to be used to give the right to take a short qualifying course leading to a recognized qualification, or may disregard it entirely.

Diplomatic recognition is a similar concept whereby one state acknowledges the existence as an entity of another.

== See also ==
- Legal status of transgender people
- Minority rights
- Spousal privilege
- Legal status of same-sex marriage
