= Brussels-Halle-Vilvoorde =

Former constituency in Belgium

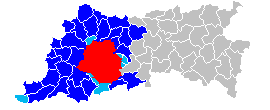
The province of Flemish Brabant: Brussels-Capital Region Arrondissement of Leuven Arrondissement of Halle-Vilvoorde Flemish municipalities with language facilities for French-speaking Belgians

Brussels-Halle-Vilvoorde (Dutch: Brussel-Halle-Vilvoorde; French: Bruxelles-Hal-Vilvorde) is a judicial arrondissement encompassing the bilingual—French and Dutch—Brussels-Capital Region, which coincides with the administrative arrondissement of Brussels-Capital and the surrounding Dutch-speaking area of Halle-Vilvoorde, which in turn coincides with the administrative arrondissement of Halle-Vilvoorde. Halle-Vilvoorde contains several municipalities with language facilities, i.e. municipalities where French-speaking people form a considerable part of the population and therefore have special language rights. The arrondissement is the location of a tribunal of first instance, enterprise tribunal and a labour tribunal.

Prior to the sixth Belgian state reform in 2012, the area also formed the electoral arrondissement of Brussels-Halle-Vilvoorde (BHV), which, as part of the same 2012 reform, was completely split into a Brussels electoral district and, together with the electoral district of Leuven, into the electoral district of the province of Flemish Brabant. All Belgian electoral arrondissements now coincide with the Belgian provinces. Before the splitting, BHV was an exception in the province of Flemish Brabant because of its official bilingual policy. One peculiarity remaining after the reform is that inhabitants of the six municipalities with language facilities around Brussels can still choose to vote for electoral lists of the Brussels-Capital Region. Brussels-Halle-Vilvoorde has been the subject of a highly sensitive dispute within Belgium and was one of the main topics of the 2007–2011 Belgian political crisis. A majority of the Flemings wanted to split it into two arrondissements (like the administrative ones), while the Francophones wanted to keep it as it was or, at a minimum, split it with concessions.

The lists for the federal and European elections were composed of both Dutch and French-language parties (in all other electoral areas it is either Dutch or French-language parties), while the area is partly monolingual Halle-Vilvoorde and bilingual Brussels. Consequently, French-speakers living in the officially monolingual Dutch-speaking electoral district of Leuven in Flanders could vote for French-language parties in BHV, and Dutch-speakers living in the officially monolingual French-speaking electoral district Nivelles in Walloon Brabant could vote for Dutch-language parties in BHV. In 2003, the Court of Arbitration ruled the BHV district to be unconstitutional, citing unequal voting rights. It was abolished as part of the 2012 sixth Belgian state reform.

== Background history ==
The Brussels judicial and electoral arrondissement, corresponding to what became later Brussels-Halle-Vilvoorde, has existed since the Belgian Revolution in 1830, when the country was created as a unitary state. At that time, French was the only language in politics, administration, justice, the army and all education except primary, to the disadvantage of Dutch speakers. Some Dutch speakers therefore decided to raise their children in French. Discrimination against the Dutch language started to lessen from the end of the 19th century onwards and came to a complete end in 1967, the year in which the Belgian Constitution got an official Dutch version.

Belgium, as a unitary state, consisted of nine provinces with several arrondissements. Each arrondissement also served as an electoral district, however some of them were later grouped together. One of the nine provinces was Brabant, which consisted of the arrondissements of Brussels, Leuven and Nivelles. Upon the fixation of the language border in 1963, the arrondissement of Brussels was split into the bilingual arrondissement of Brussels-Capital and the unilingual Halle-Vilvoorde, but was retained as grouped arrondissements forming the electoral district of Brussels-Halle-Vilvoorde. Furthermore, nothing in the judicial structure was reformed, leaving the judicial arrondissement of Brussels unchanged. In the course of history, the administrative and political situation in Belgium has changed considerably and BHV has grown to become a major exception within the contemporary federal state of Belgium.

=== 1920s–1960s ===
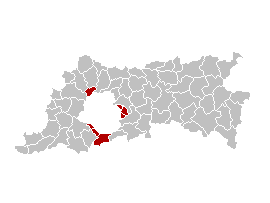
The municipalities with language facilities near Brussels

==== Dynamic system ====
In 1921 Belgium was divided into two monolingual entities (French-speaking Wallonia and Dutch-speaking Flanders). Both languages could be used in Brussels (16 municipalities at that time). A special status was established wherever a large minority used the other language along the linguistic border.

The Belgian law of 28 June 1932 on "the use of languages for administrative matters" reinforced the 1921 law and based the language status of every Belgian municipality on the decennial linguistic census. The criterion to belong to the Dutch-speaking or French-speaking language area was the attainment of a threshold of 50%; whereas, over 30% the municipal authorities had to offer services in the minority language as well. A municipality could ask the government to change its linguistic status by a royal decree only after a census would have shown a passage over the 30% or 50% threshold.

The 1932 law was implemented only once. As the invasion of Belgium by Germany in 1940 prevented the organization of the decennial census, the next (and last) linguistic census took place in 1947. The results suggested that the progression of French language had kept intensifying. These results were disputed by Flemish politicians who questioned the survey methodology. The percentage of Dutch-speakers had fallen under the 30% threshold in nine municipalities while 12 and nine municipalities had respectively passed over the threshold of 50% and 30% French-speakers. Only one municipality (Rekkem) had fallen under the threshold of 30% French-speakers. In order to mitigate their impact, the results of the 1947 census were not made public until 1954; after that an ad hoc law modifying the 1932 law was voted. Around Brussels, the three municipalities where French-speakers had passed the 50% threshold were transferred to the bilingual area of Brussels (Evere, Ganshoren and Berchem-Sainte-Agathe/Sint-Agatha-Berchem), and language facilities were granted to French-speakers in four of the five municipalities where the percentage of French-speakers had passed the 30% threshold (Drogenbos, Kraainem, Wemmel and Linkebeek).

There are no official figures to support claims, on the French-speaking side, that many more families shifted from Dutch to French after 1947. On the Flemish side, as the decennial linguistic census and the dynamic system were seen as a serious threat to their cultural territory; politicians began opposing them and Flemish mayors boycotted the 1960 census.

==== Static system ====
In order to offset Flemish fears of uninterrupted progression of the French language into the Dutch-speaking area, a deal was struck in 1961–1962, during the Lefèvre-Spaak government; that the language border would be officially fixed and would not be changed. The linguistic census and dynamic system would be abolished and replaced with a static system: the linguistic status of every municipality would be fixed once and for all.

However, the process of deciding on the geographical position of such a static linguistic border led to bitter resentment, by both communities, including within political parties which had transcended language cleavages until then. Instead of reflecting the usual left/right divide, the laws which fixed the position of the linguistic border were voted (in 1962 and 1963) by the majority formed by Flemish members in Parliament against the minority formed by their French-speaking counterparts.

These laws voted in 1962 and 1963:

Bilingual Brussels was limited to the 19 municipalities it already encompassed since 1954.

In the Flemish Halle and Vilvoorde, out of the seven municipalities where French-speakers had reached between 27% and 48% at the census of 1947, 4 kept the extended linguistic and political facilities they had been granted in 1954 and two more were granted the same (Wezembeek-Oppem and Sint-Genesius-Rode/Rhode-Saint-Genèse). (Arguing that since 1947 many more people had shifted from Dutch to French, French-speaking Members of Parliament demanded that those six municipalities to be detached from the Dutch-speaking area and added to bilingual Brussels, which was fiercely resisted by their Flemish counterparts.)

The same arrangement was made for a number of municipalities on new the border between the Dutch- and French-speaking areas, where local linguistic minorities could enjoy identical facilities: e.g. Flobecq and Enghien in the French-speaking area (where the Dutch-speaking minorities had reached respectively 7.2% and 12.1% in 1947); and Voeren/Fourons in the Dutch-speaking area (where the French-speaking population had reached 56.9% in 1947).

In 1964, the Fédéralistes Démocrates Francophones (FDF), a party advocating the extension of Brussels, was founded. By 1970 all Belgian political parties had split into Dutch-speaking and French-speaking parties. The position of the linguistic border was endorsed in the 1970 State Reform (requiring a two-thirds majority) and, in return for contributing to this endorsement, the French-speaking minority was granted new measures which included the requirement of a special majority (a two-thirds majority in total and at least 50% in each linguistic group) to pass such laws as those of 1962 and 1963 in future; and (article 54) the possibility for any linguistic group to block a bill and open negotiations when it considers that such bill seriously jeopardizes its interests.

According to the French-speaking parties, the compromise also included an agreement that in the future the existing voting and judicial opportunities for the large French-speaking minority around Brussels would be maintained and that the Brussels-Halle-Vilvoorde electoral and judicial arrondissement would remain unimpaired. The Flemish parties deny this, saying that this was never the intention. Importantly, these opportunities are not enshrined in the Constitution, but in law, and can be amended by a simple majority.

Consequently, Bills intended at splitting the BHV arrondissement have been put forward several times and countered as many times by the French-speaking minority on grounds of the article 54 of the Belgian Constitution.

=== 1970s–1990s ===
The 1970 State reform also created the Dutch, French and German Cultural Communities and laid the foundations for the establishment of three Regions.

Later on, in 1980, the Cultural Communities became known as Communities. Also two regions were established: the Flemish Region and the Walloon Region. Although the creation of a Brussels Region was provided for in 1970, the Brussels-Capital Region was not established until a later reform.

Former province of Brabant within Belgium (Flemish Brabant: bright yellow; Walloon Brabant: bright red)

The province of Brabant had been one of the nine provinces of Belgium. But due to the arrangement of the linguistic border, which passes through this province, the province was abolished after several reforms:

In 1989 Brussels-Capital Region was created, but the region was still part of the province of Brabant.

With the reform in 1993 making Belgium into a federal state, Brabant became part of all three regions: the Brussels, Flemish and Walloon Region.

Until 1995, the province of Brabant contained the following electoral arrondissements:

- the Dutch-speaking electoral arrondissement of Leuven (coinciding with the administrative arrondissement of Leuven)
- the French-speaking electoral arrondissement of Nivelles (coinciding with the administrative arrondissement of Nivelles)
- the electoral arrondissement of Brussels-Halle-Vilvoorde (coinciding with both the administrative arrondissement Brussels-Capital and Halle-Vilvoorde).

In 1995, this province was split into:

- the province of Flemish Brabant
- the province of Walloon Brabant (which coincides to the arrondissement of Nivelles)
- Brussels-Capital Region, an own bilingual region (the other two regions being the unilingual Flanders and Wallonia)

However, the arrondissements stayed the same.

=== Elections of 2003 ===
==== New electoral districts ====
For the elections in 2003, new electoral districts were created based on the provinces instead of arrondissements, because the electoral areas were too small. With regards to Brussels and the arrondissements of the province of Flemish Brabant the old arrondissements (Leuven and BHV) were retained (Walloon Brabant has only one arrondissement, so this is in fact also retained), since the French-speakers are against splitting BHV.

==== BHV is declared unconstitutional ====
In 2003, one week after the election, the Arbitration Court (Dutch: Arbitragehof, French: Cour d'Arbitrage), now the Constitutional Court of Belgium, declared the new election law unconstitutional. It judged that, among other things, the definition of the electoral arrondissement Brussels-Halle-Vilvoorde for national and European elections is a violation of the non-discrimination principle between Belgians, taken in combination with articles 1 to 5 of the Constitution (especially article 4, defining the language areas).

However, it left open the precise nature of any solution and thus did not demand the splitting of the electoral district but did not allow it to be kept as it is now.

Nevertheless, the Court declared the results of the 2003 elections (already held under the law declared unconstitutional) to be valid to avoid having to redo the elections.

The court however did not rule on all aspects of constitutionality. Among other things, it did not rule on the fact that some French-speakers now enjoy de facto rights that Flemish do not. This applies mainly to the fact that a French-speaker from Brussels who moves into a commune in the Flemish Region can still continue to vote for French-speaking Brussels candidates, but a Fleming who moves into the (equally) monolingual Walloon Region cannot vote any longer for his Flemish candidates of choice from the two regions where Dutch is an official language (Flemish Region and Brussels Region).

An element of discrimination is that French-speaking candidates from Brussels can compete for votes in a part of Flanders without being subject to the entire valid legislation (only the Belgian laws but not to the Flemish laws applicable in Flemish region), but Flemish candidates in the Walloon Region always have to obey both Belgian and regional/community legislation.

Following the ruling of the Constitutional Court, after having remained unsolved after decades, the BHV issue was suddenly a hot topic.

With the elections for the Flemish Parliament in 2004, all Flemish parties added to their programs the demand to split BHV. In the Flemish coalition agreement of 2004, the issue was included as "to be realised immediately", signed by the three large Flemish parties Christian Democratic and Flemish (CD&V), Flemish Liberals and Democrats (VLD) and Different Socialist Party (SP.A), in addition to the Flemish-nationalist New Flemish Alliance (N-VA) (the at that time CD&V cartel partner) and the left-liberal Spirit (the at that time SP.A cartel partner).

Although the Flemish government and the Flemish parliament have no legal power concerning the case, the issue was seen as a commitment of the governing parties at a federal level, VLD and SP.A, to settle the case in the federal government.

== Current arrangements and organisation in BHV ==
=== Electoral arrondissement ===
Elections of the Senate and of the European Parliament
Electors can choose between the lists competing for seats in the Dutch-speaking electoral college and for those running for seats in the French-speaking electoral college, whereas in other electoral arrondissements, electors can vote only on the list of the language area in which they live.

==== Elections of the Chamber ====
Because the former arrondissements still exist in Brabant (see the previous section(s) for more information) there is a special arrangement for the provinces of Flemish and Walloon Brabant: for the allocation of seats between the party lists on the level of the former province of Brabant, lists can be combined between Leuven and Brussels-Halle-Vilvoorde (Dutch-speaking parties do this) or between Nivelles and Brussels-Halle-Vilvoorde (French-speaking parties do this). This practice is known in French as apparentement and in Dutch as apparentering.

Voters can choose between candidates from both Flemish and Walloon parties (in all other electoral areas it is either Flemish or Walloon parties), although the area is partly monolingual Halle-Vilvoorde (belonging to the Flemish Community) and bilingual Brussels (belonging to both communities), and consequently French-speakers living in monolingual Dutch-speaking Halle-Vilvoorde can vote for French-language parties, whereas Dutch-speakers living in monolingual French-speaking Walloon Brabant (equal to the former electoral arrondissement of Nivelles) cannot vote for Dutch-language parties.

This is discrimination according to the Flemish. The Flemish want to split BHV, while French-speakers are opposed to such a split unless parts of the compromise reached in 1970 on the static system (see above) are revised at the same time. From the francophone point of view, the maintenance of the BHV district was a part of the 1970 compromise. Flemish demands for the area to be split are met with demands by the Francophone community for the six special-facility communes to be officially added to Brussels proper. This Francophone demand would create a previously non-existent "corridor" between the French-speaking region of Wallonia and majority French-speaking Brussels, much to the dismay of Flemish politicians.

Belgians who live abroad may choose in which electoral arrondissement they are registered.
The majority of the French-speakers abroad do so in BHV, according to N-VA. Whatever the case may be, for the elections of 2007 the governor of the province of Flemish Brabant (instructed by the Flemish Minister of Administrative Affairs) stroke out from the lists of registered voters in BHV, all expatriates who had filled their voter’s registration form in French, including those who had registered in Municipalities with language facilities (where communication with the local and federal administration is normally allowed in either language). Likewise, for the elections of 2010, Belgian expatriates who had filled their voter’s registration form in French were stricken out from the lists, including in the municipality with language facilities of Sint-Genesius-Rode / Rhode-Saint-Genèse.

=== Judicial arrondissement ===
Since this is one judicial arrondissement, a legal case can be handled by both Dutch-speaking and French-speaking judges. This causes a problem comparable with the electoral situation: Brussels is bilingual, and Halle-Vilvoorde is monolingual Dutch, so it is possible that a French judge is appointed a legal case from the Dutch-speaking Halle-Vilvoorde region, which is unfair from a Flemish point of view. The fact that Brussels has a more extensive court network, for example the Law Courts of Brussels, adds to this issue.

=== Municipalities ===
Municipalities in the arrondissement (the 19 municipalities of Brussels are displayed as one area).

The arrondissement consists of the following municipalities (in total accounting for around 1,595,000 inhabitants on 1 January 2006):

==== Halle-Vilvoorde ====
- Affligem
- Asse
- Beersel
- Bever
- Dilbeek
- Drogenbos
- Galmaarden
- Gooik
- Grimbergen
- Halle
- Herne
- Hoeilaart
- Kampenhout
- Kapelle-op-den-Bos
- Kraainem
- Lennik
- Liedekerke
- Linkebeek
- Londerzeel
- Machelen
- Meise
- Merchtem
- Opwijk
- Overijse
- Pepingen
- Roosdaal
- Sint-Genesius-Rode
- Sint-Pieters-Leeuw
- Steenokkerzeel
- Ternat
- Vilvoorde
- Wemmel
- Wezembeek-Oppem
- Zaventem
- Zemst

==== Brussels ====
(names are written in respectively French and Dutch)

- Anderlecht
- Brussels (municipality) (French: Bruxelles-ville / Dutch: Brussel-stad)
- Ixelles / Elsene
- Etterbeek
- Evere
- Ganshoren
- Jette
- Koekelberg
- Auderghem / Oudergem
- Schaerbeek / Schaarbeek
- Berchem-Sainte-Agathe / Sint-Agatha-Berchem
- Saint-Gilles / Sint-Gillis
- Molenbeek-Saint-Jean / Sint-Jans-Molenbeek
- Saint-Josse-ten-Noode / Sint-Joost-ten-Node
- Woluwe-Saint-Lambert / Sint-Lambrechts-Woluwe
- Woluwe-Saint-Pierre / Sint-Pieters-Woluwe
- Uccle / Ukkel
- Forest / Vorst
- Watermael-Boitsfort / Watermaal-Bosvoorde

== Points of view ==
=== Flemish point of view ===
Many legal experts in Flanders, such as Paul Van Orshoven and Matthias Storme, argue that there is no way out, other than splitting BHV, that will respect the entire Belgian constitution.

On the political level, Flemings argue that French-speakers who choose to live in Flanders should respect the Flemish institutions, legislation and official language (Dutch), and should stop requesting an exceptional status (of not having to respect the Flemish institutions that are constitutionally established and internationally recognized). French-speakers are asked to respect the division of Belgium into four linguistic areas, a democratically approved division with the support of a majority of French-speaking members of the Belgian parliament.

Flemings say that they want the same level of respect for their institutions as is the case everywhere else in the European Union.

=== Francophone point of view ===
Just as unanimously, at least among the political parties, most French-speaking politicians claim that those French-speakers who live in the Flemish Region should have the right to be treated as a linguistic minority that falls under the Framework Convention for the Protection of National Minorities. This would then give them a kind of an "extraterritorial" voting right.

This point of view differs sharply from many French-speaking businessman and academics. BECI, a Brussels-based employers organisation with 90% membership of French-speaking businessmen, explicitly states it respects all the existing institutions, including the boundaries between the language areas. Similarly, a growing number of French-speaking intellectuals and academics state that French-speakers living in the Flemish region should stop behaving as if they are not in Flanders and thus vote for the Flemish electoral college.

Philippe Van Parijs, a leading French-speaking philosopher and economist from the UCL also defends strict 'territoriality' and for ending both the linguistic facilities and the 'extraterritorial' voting rights for French-speakers living in the Flemish Region. He defended it in an interview in De Standaard and Le Soir on 23 August 2007.

=== Legal and political considerations ===
There is a lack of consensus in national legal authorities about this subject as they seem divided between French and Dutch speakers. The French-speaking Community and the Flemish Community have a different interpretation of the language facilities enjoyed by the French-speaking population in some municipalities.

There are binding rulings (as early as from 1968) from the European Court of Human Rights in Strasbourg, an institution with direct authority in all EU states, to confirm that the recognition of specific minority rights for the French-speakers is to be limited to a very few number of municipalities and to a limited set of public services.

Regular supra-national recommendations from the Council of Europe, a body without direct authority and therefore a lesser status in the legal order in Belgium, expressed concerns in 2002 that the minority of French speakers in Flanders should be recognized and protected as an official linguistic minority, as defined by advise of the Venice Commission. However, other reports from this institution provide arguments to the contrary (e.g. the fact that the francophones in Flanders cannot be regarded as looking back on longstanding and peaceful relations with the Flemish authorities). Also, they cannot be regarded as being "sufficient in numbers" within the Council's definition so as to constitute a linguistic minority within Flanders.

Flemish authorities have stated that the recommendations from the Council of Europe are invalid as they did not take into account the Belgian constitution or the European jurisprudence, which confirms a very limited definition of the 'language facilities'. As such, the Council of Europe and especially its 'rapporteurs', appear to be neglecting the special character of Belgium. It should also be noted that, the French language minority around Brussels is of quite recent origin (see Francization of Brussels). There is no 'historic French-speaking minority' in these areas.

== Negotiations and attempts to split BHV ==
=== Government negotiations 2004–2005 ===
In 2005, cabinet ministers and parties had been locked in debate over the future of this electoral district, and long-overdue decisions had not been reached.

Compromise solutions have been proposed:

- BHV could be joined to the neighbouring Flemish electoral district of Leuven, allowing greater numbers of Dutch speakers a vote in a combined Brussels-Halle-Vilvoorde-Leuven district.
- In return for leaving BHV in its current state, one might accomplish Flemish demands for specific powers currently under federal jurisdiction to be conferred to the Regions.

A deadline of 11 May 2005, by which time a decision was to be reached, expired without a compromise. A compromise worked out by Prime Minister Guy Verhofstadt was explicitly opposed by only one coalition partner, namely the Flemish party Spirit. It is believed that this compromise would have entitled the French Community with the right to exercise certain, limited powers over inhabitants of the Flemish Community, in return for the splitting of BHV.

After visiting King Albert II to report the failure of the seven negotiation meetings to reach a successful conclusion, the Prime Minister requested a vote of confidence from the parliament. The Parliament supported the government on 13 May 2005 and the issue was put on hold until the next general election in 2007.

=== Elections in 2007 ===
With the federal elections of 10 June 2007 looming, the problem of the electoral district of Brussels-Halle-Vilvoorde reemerged. Because the federal government failed to comply with a ruling of the Court of Arbitration that declared the provincial electoral districts compared to the two remaining arrondisemental ones in the former province of Brabant unconstitutional, several mayors in the Brussels-Halle-Vilvoorde area have threatened to refuse to compile the lists of electors.

Professor and constitutional expert Paul Van Orshoven from the Katholieke Universiteit Leuven declared that the elections, held on 10 June were unconstitutional for two reasons:

- As the previous election was held on 18 May 2003, the final date to hold elections (four years from the previous) was 13 May 2007.
- The Court of Arbitration gave the government the time to fix the BHV problem until the next elections were scheduled; otherwise, the election results were supposed to be declared void.

As in 2003, several mayors and groupings have called for a boycott of the elections, and 24 communes have refused to cooperate in the organization of the elections. In May 2007, the municipality of Steenokkerzeel launched a court case against the federal government for not complying with the ruling of the Court of Arbitration. The case should have started on 25 May 2007 but the case was mistakenly scheduled in a one-judge court room rather than a three-judge court room and so was delayed.

=== 2007–2008 formation of the government ===
The problem of BHV became an important issue in the 2007–2008 Belgian government formation. On 7 November 2007, the Flemish parties voted at the Committee on the Interior of the Chamber of Representatives for the disentanglement, while the French-speaking parties refused to vote and left the room. This situation has never previously occurred in Belgian history. All representatives of the Flemish parties voted in favor of the split of the BHV electoral district, with the exception of Tinne van der Straeten, of Groen!, the Flemish green party, who abstained.

This situation shows that the Belgian debate goes far beyond legal quarrels about BHV; as the power of Walloon institutions decrease (and this since its industrial breakdown in the late 1960s) and as the Flemish government clearly consolidates its ideological orientation toward a situation of cultural domination, supported by demographic and financial matters. Every step in the Belgian debate can be interpreted symbolically as a fight between two cultures that might show mutual respect only when they can be protected from each other's domination.

On 23 December, the interim Government officially came into office. The transitional period came to an end on 20 March 2008, when Yves Leterme was sworn in as Prime Minister of the Leterme I Government. Negotiations continued, but again no solution was reached, and Leterme offered the King his resignation on 15 July 2008, but the King refused.

=== Elections in 2010 ===
The newly appointed Flemish President of the Constitutional Court Marc Bossuyt has stated that federal elections (after 2007) would be deemed "unconstitutional" if a legal arrangement for Brussels-Halle-Vilvoorde were not put into place by then.

According to Article 65 of the Belgian Constitution, the Federal Parliament ends after four years, automatically leading to new federal elections within 40 days. This means the next federal elections were scheduled for 2011.

In April 2010, the Flemish liberal VLD withdrew themselves from the government because no solution was found for the problem of BHV at the agreed upon date and so caused the collapse of the Leterme II Government. Consequently, new elections had to be set up, resulting in the general elections of June 2010.

For these elections, several mayors in Halle-Vilvoorde started a legal procedure because BHV was still not solved, and they refused to organise the elections in their municipalities, as with the previous two federal elections. The province of Flemish Brabant organised the elections instead.

After these general elections, the next government will have to find a solution for BHV. N-VA, the winner and now largest party of Flanders and Belgium, want to split BHV without concessions for French speakers. During the 2010 Belgian government formation, a solution for BHV has been part of a larger agreement. Mid-September 2011 a tentative agreement was reached to partially split the district.

== Agreement and consequences of splitting BHV ==
As part of the sixth Belgian state reform, the electoral district has been split and the judicial arrondissement has been reformed. On 13 July 2012 the Belgian Chamber of Representatives voted the laws (106-42) regarding the splitting of BHV. On 19 July 2012, the laws were signed by King Albert II in a public ceremony.

=== Electoral district ===
The BHV electoral district is split, and the Halle-Vilvoorde electoral area is merged with the Leuven electoral area, forming a single provincial constituency corresponding to the province of Flemish Brabant; and the Brussels electoral area became a new separate single constituency corresponding to the Brussels Region.

Inhabitants living in Halle-Vilvoorde, whether French-speaking or Dutch speaking, lost the possibility to vote for politicians from Brussels during the federal elections. However, the inhabitants of the six Flemish municipalities around Brussels with French language facilities, being Linkebeek, Wezembeek-Oppem, Kraainem, Drogenbos, Wemmel and Sint-Genesius-Rode, are given the opportunity to choose their vote on a list either from Brussels or from Flemish Brabant, but are not allowed to vote for both.

French-speaking parties of HV would need to form one francophone list to be able to gain a seat in the federal parliament, and French-speaking politicians from Brussels will lose votes that they would otherwise gain in the Flemish periphery around Brussels.

Dutch-speaking parties in Brussels would need to form one Flemish list or form an electoral list alliance to be able to gain one or two seats in the federal parliament, and Dutch-speaking politicians of the whole BHV area will lose votes that they would otherwise gain in Brussels (the number of Dutch-speakers roughly corresponds to two out of the seven seats Brussels would be allocated proportionally by population).

=== Judicial district ===
For language use in judicial matters, the Halle-Vilvoorde part will align with the language use in the Flemish Region so that all judicial matters are handled in Dutch, as it is the sole official language of the Flemish Region. The status concerning the Brussels Region will not change, as Brussels is a bilingual region; matters will still be handled in either French or Dutch.

According to Glenn Audenaert, the head of the federal judicial police, splitting BHV could have negative effects for the safety in the area, since criminals based in Brussels (an officially bilingual but mostly French-speaking city) often act in the Dutch-speaking area around it and would have to be judged in Dutch-speaking courts of the Flemish Region.

There has been criticism of the agreement, for example a Brussels lawyer noting that it is startlingly complex, difficult to accomplish and very disadvantageous to Flanders.

== See also ==
- 2007 Belgian government formation, 2010 Belgian government formation
- Communities, regions and language areas of Belgium
- De Gordel
- Francization of Brussels
- Irredentism
- Language legislation in Belgium
- Municipalities with language facilities
- Partition of Belgium
- Politics of Belgium
- State reform in Belgium
