= Hubert Bonnet =

Businessman, entrepreneur and art collector

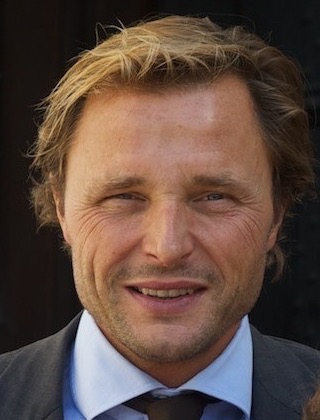
- Born: Belgium
- Occupations: Businessman, entrepreneur and art collector
- Parent(s): Pierre Bonnet and Berthe Germeau

Hubert Bonnet is a Switzerland-based Belgian businessman, entrepreneur and art collector.

== Family ==
Hubert Bonnet, son of Pierre Bonnet and Berthe Germeau, was born to an influential family in the Belgian steel industry. At the time, the Clabecq Forge, located twenty kilometres from Brussels, specialised in the production of steel, and more specifically railway lines.

Hubert's mother, the sole heir of Eugène Germeau, the businessman at the helm of Clabecq before the World War II, served as vice-president to the board of directors for many years. With her husband, Pierre Bonnet, they played a significant part in all the major transformations, including those during times of crisis. In 1974, while the Forges were in the hands of the Dessy family, the Germeau-Bonnet sold their stake to Cobepa alse, the holding company of the French group Paribas, in which they became one of the Belgian shareholding families until the takeover bid by BNP Paribas in 2000.

== Education ==
Hubert Bonnet grew up between Rhode-Saint-Genèse and Knokke. After spending his first years at the Cardinal Mercier College in Braine-L'Alleud, he began his postgraduate course at the European Business School in Brussels, where he obtained a BBA. He then moved on to the University of Montreux in Switzerland before completing his training with an MBA at the University of Dallas in Texas.

Passionate about travel and discovery since childhood, Hubert Bonnet benefitted from his studies abroad through enriching encounters and by developing new areas of interest. It was during this era that his passion for art was born, influenced by the audacity of creations by American artists.

== Professional life ==
Qualifications in hand, the 27-year-old Hubert Bonnet moved to New York City and began his professional life as a trader for Cadogan Management.

After the death of his mother in 1996, he returned to Belgium and became a director of Cobepa until the takeover bid by BNP Paribas in 2000. Then, while continuing his activities in the financial sector, he ventured into real estate and created his first company. With H Group, he created prestigious projects, acquiring unique properties and improving them with the savoir-faire of renowned architects. His clients were mainly private investors, concerned about the security of their investments. Today, after twenty years of operation, H Group has added its signature to a number of residences in Belgium, notably in the Prince d'Orange district of Uccle, Châtelain in Ixelles, in Zoute, the Dominican Republic, London, Paris, Ibiza and Saint-Tropez.

In Switzerland, his country of residence, he is also involved in the development of real estate projects in the Valais canton and in Geneva.

Since 2015, Hubert Bonnet has provided a new activity to complete his real estate offer. With Bibi Home, he offers the rental of prestigious locations and a complete service to his customers. The concept also includes an artistic element, since outside high season he offers these prestigious residences to artists for workshops to research, reflect and create.

In addition to real estate, Hubert Bonnet also formed the company Meaunet (2004), then Financière H2O (2008), both operating in the financial sector. In 2005, he also became shareholder and director of Groupe Josi.

== Art collector and promoter ==
Hubert Bonnet is an art collector who travels internationally to discover emerging talent, attending galleries, private viewings, and art fairs. His collection focuses primarily on minimal and conceptual art.

In 2012, while looking for a place to store his works, Hubert Bonnet discovered an 800m2 former coal warehouse, just a few steps from the lakes of Ixelles. This location became the CAB, an independent art centre dedicated to the promotion of contemporary Belgian and international art. Each year it offers two thematic exhibitions – one from September to December and one from April to June – whereby it offers artists visibility in a place that is neither an institution nor a gallery. As director of the centre, Hubert Bonnet is involved in all levels of decision making, from the theme of the exhibition to the choice of artists.

== Mandates and charities ==
To reduce the dangers facing children around the world, Hubert Bonnet set up the Bibi Foundation, based in Switzerland, which carries out development assistance independently (Burma, Burundi) or jointly with other similar bodies. The BIBI Foundation supports the NGO ODDY-C.

Hubert Bonnet is also a member of the Entrepreneurs' Organization (EO Network) and the Alumni of the European Business School.
