= Arrondissement of Halle-Vilvoorde =

Administrative Arrondissement of Halle-Vilvoorde Arrondissement Halle-Vilvoorde
- Arrondissement
- Location of the arrondissement in Flemish Brabant
- Coordinates: 50.85°N 4.2°E
- Country: Belgium
- Region: Flanders
- Province: Flemish Brabant
- Municipalities: 33

Area
  - Total: 942.93 km^{2} (364.07 sq mi)

Population (1 January 2017)
  - Total: 627,247
  - Density: 665.21/km^{2} (1,722.9/sq mi)
- Time zone: UTC+1 (CET)
  - Summer (DST): UTC+2 (CEST)

The Halle-Vilvoorde Arrondissement (Dutch: Arrondissement Halle-Vilvoorde) is one of the two administrative arrondissements in the Belgian province of Flemish Brabant. It almost completely surrounds the Brussels-Capital Region and lies to the west of the other arrondissement in the province, the Leuven Arrondissement. Unlike the Arrondissement of Leuven, it is not a judicial arrondissement; however since the sixth Belgian state reform in 2012–14, it has its own public prosecutor's service.

The Halle-Vilvoorde Arrondissement and the Brussels-Capital Region together formed the Brussels-Halle-Vilvoorde electoral district and the Judicial Arrondissement of Brussels. Following the 2007 federal election, Yves Leterme, who was in charge of the negotiations for forming a new Federal Government, proposed to split up the Judicial Arrondissement of Brussels into two judicial arrondissements: one comprising Halle-Vilvoorde and the other comprising the Brussels Region.

== History ==
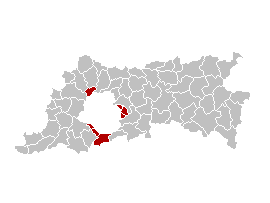
The municipalities with language facilities near Brussels

The Arrondissement of Halle-Vilvoorde was established in 1963 when the language borders were determined. At that time, the then Administrative Arrondissement of Brussels, which had the same territory as the present-day Judicial Arrondissement of Brussels, was split into three administrative arrondissements, two of which still exist today:

- Brussels-Capital, which consists of the 19 municipalities of the Brussels Region;
- Halle-Vilvoorde, a unilingual Dutch-speaking administrative arrondissement;
- Brussels-Periphery, which consisted of the six Flemish municipalities with language facilities for French-speakers around Brussels.

On January 1, 1971, the Arrondissement of Brussels-Periphery ceased to exist and its municipalities were added to Halle-Vilvoorde.

In 1977, the then municipality of Muizen ceased to exist and was ceded to the Arrondissement of Mechelen, in the Province of Antwerp.

== Municipalities ==
The Administrative Arrondissement of Halle-Vilvoorde is made up of the following municipalities:

- Affligem
- Asse
- Beersel
- Bever
- Dilbeek
- Drogenbos
- Grimbergen
- Halle
- Hoeilaart
- Kampenhout
- Kapelle-op-den-Bos
- Kraainem
- Lennik
- Liedekerke
- Linkebeek
- Londerzeel
- Machelen
- Meise
- Merchtem
- Opwijk
- Overijse
- Pajottegem
- Pepingen
- Roosdaal
- Sint-Genesius-Rode
- Sint-Pieters-Leeuw
- Steenokkerzeel
- Ternat
- Vilvoorde
- Wemmel
- Wezembeek-Oppem
- Zaventem
- Zemst

== Population ==
Population as of 1 January in recent years:

Year	Population
1990	533,719
1995	549,165
2000	558,220
2005	572,697
2010	593,455
2015	617,330
2017	627,247

== See also ==
- Brussels Periphery (Vlaamse Rand)
