= Arrondissement of Brussels-Periphery =

The Arrondissement of Brussels-Periphery (Dutch: Arrondissement Brussel-Randgemeenten) was an administrative arrondissement in the Belgian Province of Brabant. It existed from 1963 to 1971 and comprised the six municipalities in the Brussels periphery (Dutch: Brusselse Rand; French: Périphérie bruxelloise) with language facilities.

== History ==
The arrondissement was created in 1963, when the bilingual Arrondissement of Brussels was split up into three administrative arrondissements: the bilingual Arrondissement of Brussels-Capital, the unilingual Dutch-speaking Arrondissement of Halle-Vilvoorde and a peculiar arrondissement that officially didn't have a name, but was commonly referred to as Brussels-Periphery, and which comprised the six municipalities with language facilities around Brussels. It ceased to exist in 1971, when it was subsumed into Halle-Vilvoorde.

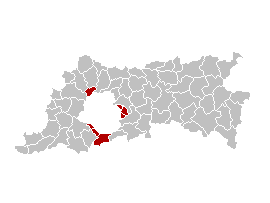
Map of the former administrative arrondissement in the present-day Province of Flemish Brabant

== Municipalities ==
The arrondissement consisted of the following municipalities:

- Drogenbos
- Kraainem
- Linkebeek
- Sint-Genesius-Rode
- Wemmel
- Wezembeek-Oppem
