= Brussels Periphery =

Flemish municipalities encircling Brussels

Location of Brussels in Belgium and the EU

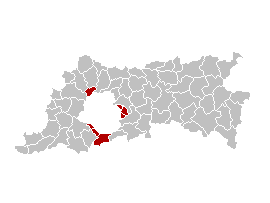
The former arrondissement of Brussels-Periphery within the province of Flemish Brabant, corresponding to the six municipalities with language facilities.

The Brussels Periphery (Dutch: Brusselse Rand; "Brussels Rim") or Flemish Rim (Vlaamse Rand or De Rand; "the Rim"; French: Périphérie bruxelloise) refers to 19 Flemish municipalities that encircle the Brussels-Capital Region. The Brussels Region is an enclave of the province of Flemish Brabant.

Due to their proximity to Brussels, the municipalities are highly urbanised with elevated housing prices. As a consequence, a well-paid workforce employed by EU institutions reside there. Another issue, very sensitive in Belgian politics, is the francisation of this area. These municipalities all have Dutch as their sole official language, although six municipalities also offer services (known as language facilities) for French-speaking inhabitants, namely Drogenbos, Kraainem, Linkebeek, Sint-Genesius-Rode, Wemmel and Wezembeek-Oppem. Other municipalities include Asse, Beersel, Dilbeek, Grimbergen, Hoeilaart, Machelen, Meise, Merchtem, Overijse, Sint-Pieters-Leeuw, Tervuren, Vilvoorde and Zaventem.

Each year, De Gordel ("the belt"), a family walking and cycling event, is organised in this area as a symbolic affirmation that the municipalities involved are part of Flanders.

== See also ==
- Municipalities with language facilities
- Francisation of Brussels
- Arrondissement of Brussels-Periphery
