= Herstappe =

Municipality in Limburg province of Belgium

- Municipality
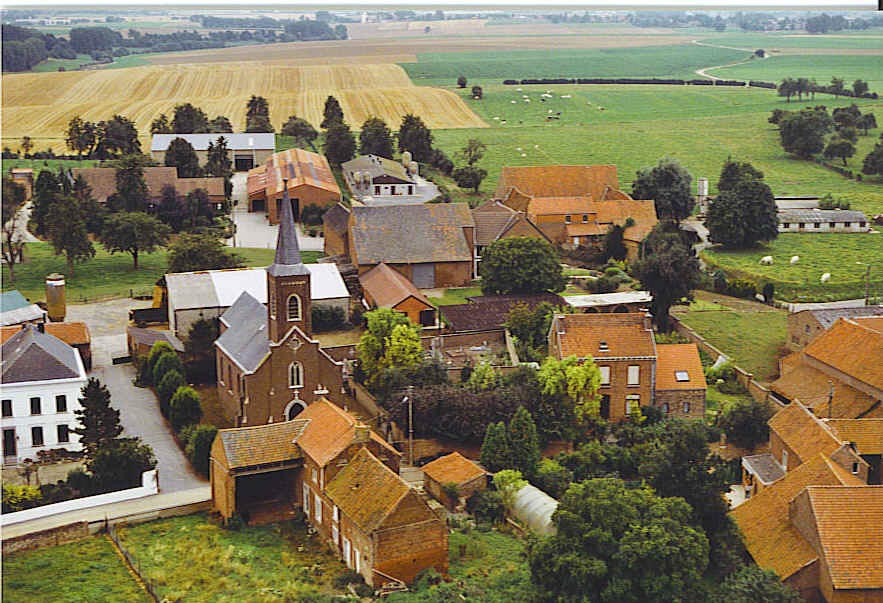
- Aerial view of Herstappe

- Flag Coat of arms

- Location of Herstappe in Limburg
- Interactive map of Herstappe
- Location in Belgium
- Coordinates: 50°44′N 05°26′E
- Country: Belgium
- Community: Flemish Community
- Region: Flemish Region
- Province: Limburg
- Arrondissement: Tongeren

Government
  - Mayor: Marlutje Jackers (GB-IC)
  - Governing party: GB-IC

Area
  - Total: 1.35 km^{2} (0.52 sq mi)

Population (2018-01-01)
  - Total: 88
  - Density: 65/km^{2} (170/sq mi)
- Postal codes: 3717
- NIS code: 73028
- Area codes: 012

Herstappe (Dutch pronunciation: [ˈɦɛrstɑpə]; French pronunciation: [ɛʁstap]) is a Flemish municipality located in the Belgian province of Limburg. On January 1, 2016, Herstappe had a total population of 89. The total area is 1.35 km^{2} which gives a population density of 66 inhabitants per km^{2}. It is the least populous municipality in Belgium, and the third smallest in area.

Herstappe has a bilingual (Limburgish and Walloon) population. Formally it is a municipality with linguistic facilities for French speakers, which has so far prevented a merger with neighbouring Tongeren from taking place.

== Public buildings ==
The village holds a cafe, a municipal office, a Roman Catholic church and a post office. All have bilingual signposts.

== Elections ==
For the Belgian local elections, 2012, Herstappe was the only Belgian municipality where elections were not held as there was only one candidate list. Previously, this had already happened between 1958 and 1994.

== Mayors ==
The former mayor from 1994 to 2014, Serge Louwet, was the lowest paid Belgian mayor in 2012 with €675 for his monthly wages. Actually, his official salary is €1,400 but he considered it too high and kept only 675, the rest being given back to the municipal treasurer.

In 2014, Mayor Louwet resigned in favour of Claudy Prosmans. The first action of the new mayor was to guide Herstappe into the digital era. He wanted to buy a computer for the town hall, complete with an internet connection, and they were also looking into the creation of an official website.

== Gallery ==
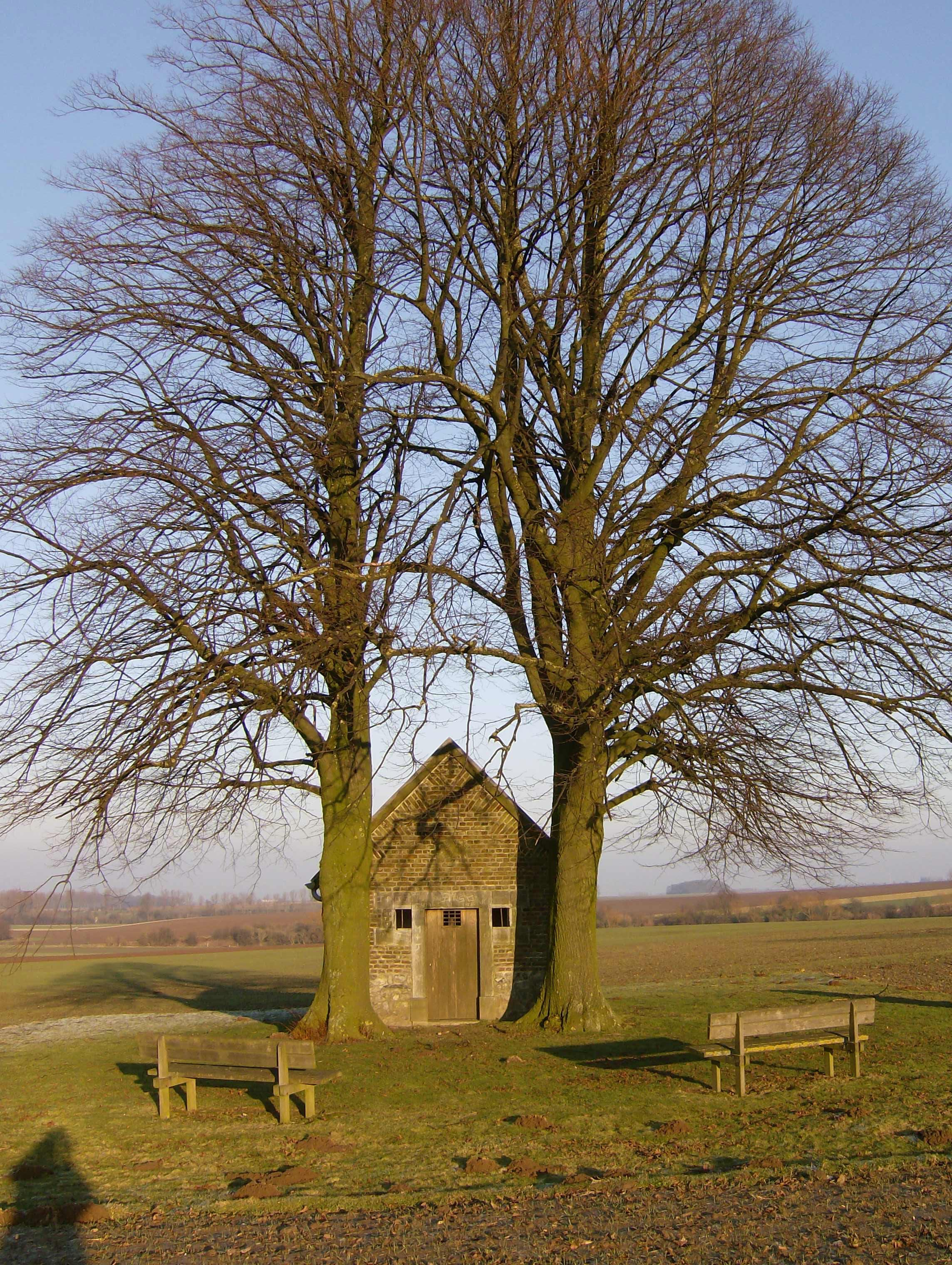
The Heilig Huisje near Herstappe

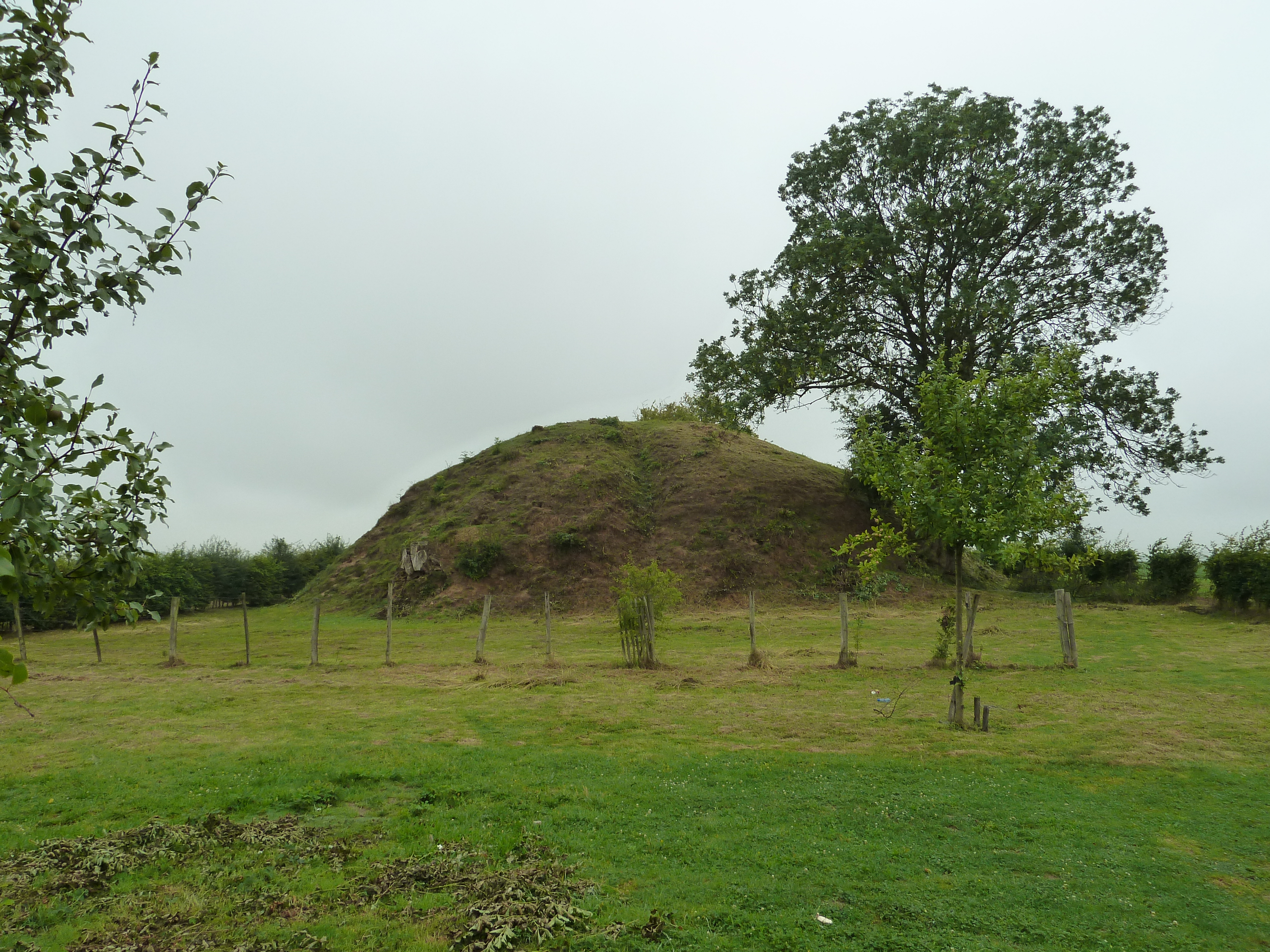
The Herstappeltombe
