= De Gordel =

Family cycling and walking event in the Brussels Periphery of Belgium

De Gordel (Dutch, pronounced [də ˈɣɔrdəl], meaning "the belt") is a family cycling and walking event in the Brussels Periphery of Belgium. The event is organised by Sport Vlaanderen, each year since 1981 on the first Sunday of September. It is meant as a symbolic affirmation that the municipalities involved are part of Flanders. It also expresses the solidarity of the entire Flemish community with the Flemings living in these villages.

Depending on the weather, up to 100,000 participants (in 2005) attend, either cycling or walking. In 2008, bad weather resulted in the lower attendance number of 58,000. The 2010 edition saw more than 80,000 participants.

While opinion on the event varies, some French-speakers see participation as a political move by those who choose to take part (including Prime Minister Guy Verhofstadt in 2005). In 2006, Minister-President of Flanders Yves Leterme said: "The Gordel is a pleasant way to say that we want to keep the villages around Brussels Flemish.". As Prime Minister, Yves Leterme did not participate in 2008.

So close to Brussels, and passing through several Flemish towns with French-speaking majorities in some areas, this sports event gains wide television coverage through news reports and serves as a very visual reminder that linguistic and political divisions among neighbouring regions and even neighbours themselves remain alive in the area immediately surrounding Brussels.

== Incidents ==
De Gordel has fallen victim to sabotage actions several times in the past. During the 2006 event, local police caught a well-known French-speaking lawyer, Sébastien Courtoy, and another person throwing thumbtacks on the road. In 2008 and 2010 an increase in thumbtack throwing was noted.

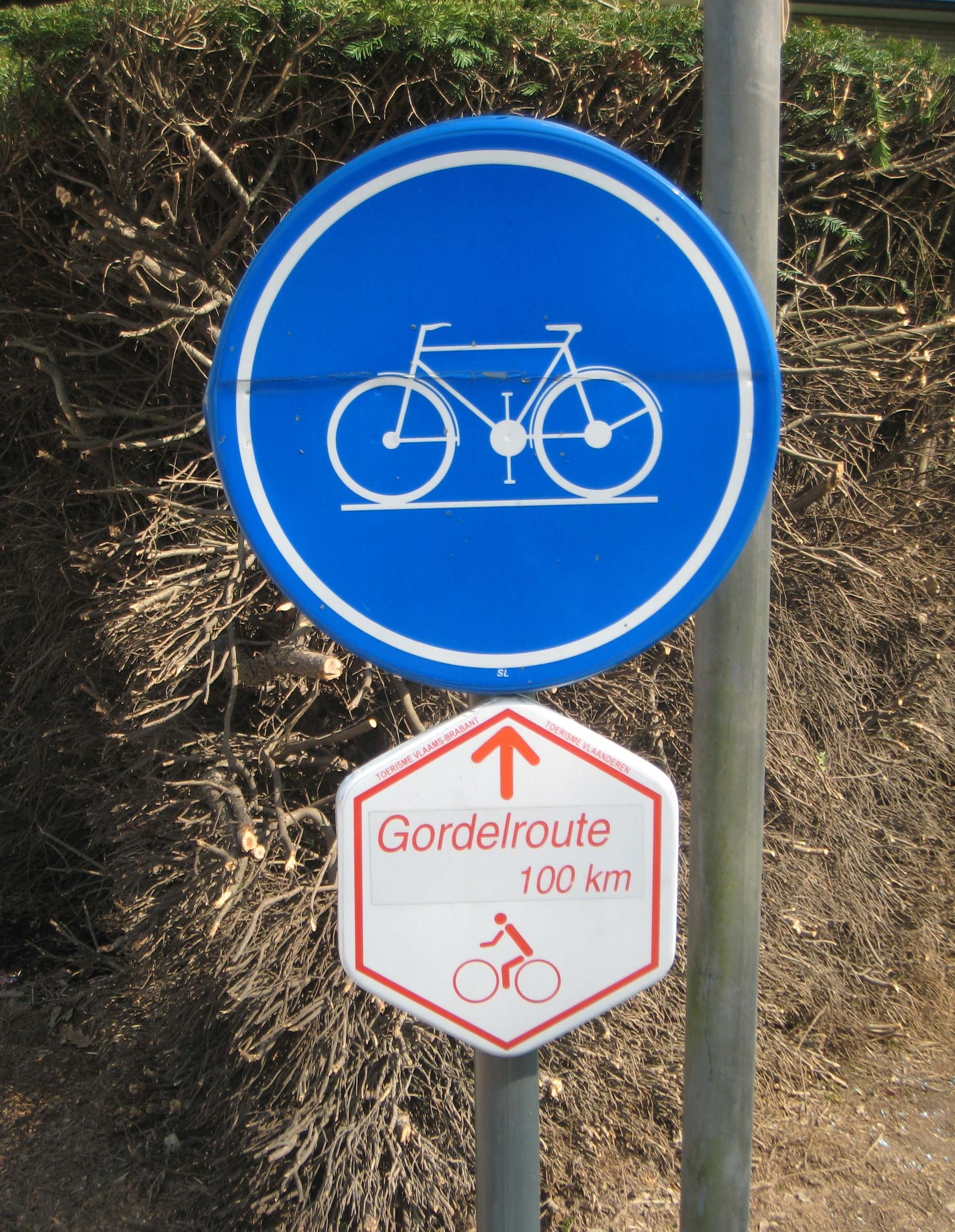
Sign indicating the Gordelroute

== Gordelroute permanent cycle route ==
The Gordelroute is a permanent cycle route encircling Brussels, based on De Gordel. It does not follow the same route as that used in the event, mainly following quieter roads and cycle paths, but is approximately the same distance (100 km).

== See also ==
- Municipalities with language facilities
- Brussels-Halle-Vilvoorde
