= Bever, Belgium =

Bever
- Municipality
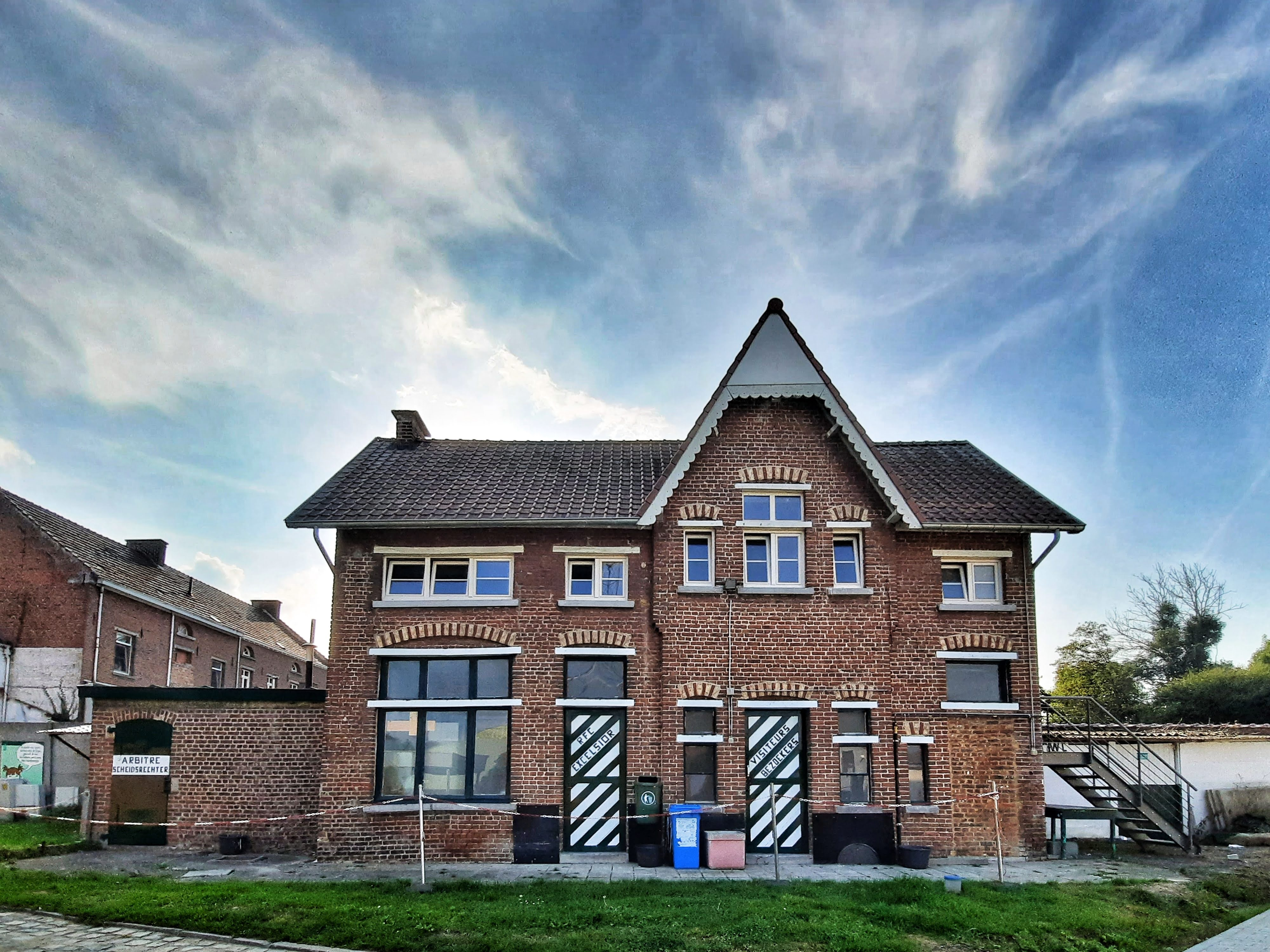

- Flag Coat of arms

- Location of Bever in Flemish Brabant
- Interactive map of Bever
- Location in Belgium
- Coordinates: 50°43′N 03°56′E
- Country: Belgium
- Community: Flemish Community
- Region: Flemish Region
- Province: Flemish Brabant
- Arrondissement: Halle-Vilvoorde

Government
  - Mayor: Dirk Willem (CD&V)
  - Governing party: CD&V

Area
  - Total: 19.24 km^{2} (7.43 sq mi)

Population (2018-01-01)
  - Total: 2,204
  - Density: 114.6/km^{2} (296.7/sq mi)
- Postal codes: 1547
- NIS code: 23009
- Area codes: 054, 02
- Website: www.bever-bievene.be

Bever (Dutch pronunciation: [ˈbeːvər]; French: Biévène, French pronunciation: [bjevɛn]) is a municipality located in the Belgian province of Flemish Brabant. The municipality only comprises the town of Bever proper. It is located in the Pajottenland. It is located at 50°43′N 3°56′E. On January 1, 2018, Bever had a total population of 2,204. The total area is 19.78 km^{2} which gives a population density of 111 inhabitants per km^{2}. It is a Dutch-speaking village with language facilities for French-speakers.
