= Municipalities of Belgium with language facilities =

Multi-linguistic status in Belgium

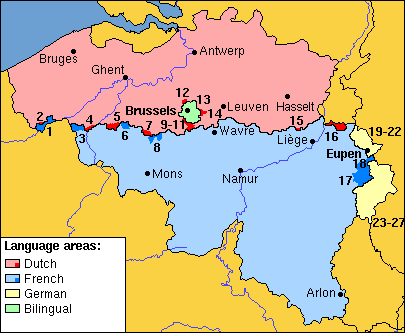
The municipalities with language facilities in Belgium, shaded darker. All of the German area (in yellow) has language facilities.: 1. Comines-Warneton 2. Mesen 3. Mouscron 4. Spiere-Helkijn 5. Ronse 6. Flobecq 7. Bever 8. Enghien 9. Drogenbos 10. Linkebeek 11. Sint-Genesius-Rode 12. Wemmel 13. Kraainem 14. Wezembeek-Oppem 15. Herstappe 16. Voeren 17. Malmedy 18. Waimes 19. Lontzen 20. Raeren 21. Eupen 22. Kelmis 23. Burg-Reuland 24. Sankt Vith 25. Amel 26. Bütgenbach 27. Büllingen

In Belgium, there are 27 municipalities with language facilities (Dutch: faciliteitengemeenten [ˌfaːsiliˈtɛitə(n)ɣəˌmeːntə(n)]; French: communes à facilités [kɔmyn a fasilite]; German: Fazilitäten-Gemeinden [fatsiliˈtɛːtn̩ ɡəˈmaɪndn̩]), which must offer linguistic services to residents in Dutch, French, or German in addition to their single official languages. All other municipalities – with the exception of those in the bilingual Brussels region – are monolingual and offer services only in their official languages, either Dutch or French.

Belgian law stipulates that:

- 12 municipalities in Flanders must offer services in French; of these 12, the six located around Brussels are now believed to have become majority French-speaking.
- Wallonia contains two language areas:
  - In the French-speaking part of Wallonia, four municipalities offer services in Dutch and another two offer services in German.
  - In the German-speaking part of Wallonia (annexed after WWI), all nine municipalities offer services in French in addition to German.
- In Brussels, Dutch and French are co-official.
- At the federal level, Dutch, French and German are all official languages.

== History ==
=== 1921–1962 ===
There were three language areas as from the 31 July 1921 law: the Dutch-speaking Flemish area, the French-speaking Walloon area, and the bilingual area of Brussels (capital city). These language areas of 1921 actually had no institutional translation in the structure of the Belgian state, then still constitutionally divided into provinces and municipalities. Thence a French-speaking unilingual municipality could, for instance, be part of the province of West Flanders.

The Belgian law of 28 June 1932, on the use of languages for administrative matters based the language status of every Belgian municipality on the decennial census that included, since 1846, several language questions about the knowledge as well as the day-to-day practice. The criterion to belong to the Flemish- or Walloon-language area was a threshold of 50%; whereas, with a threshold of 30%, the municipal authorities had to offer services in the minority language as well. A municipality could ask the government to change its linguistic status by a royal decree only after a census showed a passage over the 30% or 50% threshold.

The German- and Luxembourgish-speaking minorities in Eastern Wallonia were not mentioned in the 1921 or 1931 laws. The German-speaking minority was mostly settled in the 'Eastern Cantons', several Prussian municipalities ceded to Belgium by the 1919 Treaty of Versailles and administered from 1920 to 1925 by a Belgian military High Commissioner. There was, and still is, a Luxembourgish-speaking minority in some municipalities bordering the Grand Duchy of Luxembourg.

The 1932 law was implemented only once, as the invasion of Belgium by Nazi Germany in 1940 prevented the organization of the decennial census, which was organized in 1947 and applied only on 2 July 1954, when an ad hoc law modifying the law of 28 June 1932 on the use of languages for administrative matters transferred three previously unilingual Flemish municipalities with language facilities to the French-speaking minority (Evere, Ganshoren, and Berchem-Sainte-Agathe) to the bilingual region of Brussels, thus and introduced language facilities for the French-speaking minority in four previously unilingual Flemish municipalities (Drogenbos, Kraainem, Wemmel, and Linkebeek).

=== 1962 onwards ===
In 1962–1963 four language areas were formally determined: the Dutch-language area (now also corresponding with the Flemish Region), the bilingual area of Brussels-Capital (whose borders came to determine those of the present Brussels-Capital Region), the French-language area, and the German-language area (together coinciding with Wallonia).

The situation around Brussels (in the rim municipalities, see below) differs from the situation along the border between Flanders and Wallonia, and between the German- and French-speaking areas in Wallonia, where certain municipalities have had linguistic minorities for several centuries. The language border appears quite stable and peaceful, except for the municipalities of Voeren (French: Fourons) and, to a much lesser extent, Mouscron (Dutch: Moeskroen) and Comines-Warneton (Dutch: Komen-Waasten).

During the 1970s, many municipalities were merged into a bigger municipality in order to lessen administrative overhead. However, the difficult situation of the municipalities with language facilities had the effect that no other municipalities liked to merge with those (unless they had the same facilities already). As a result, many of the smallest municipalities in Belgium today are municipalities with language facilities. S.a. the least populated municipality (Herstappe) and the smallest municipality with a city title (Mesen).

In the early 1990s, a revision of the Belgian Constitution made it more difficult to change the language status of the concerned municipalities by requiring that any such change had to gain a majority in each of the two language groups in the House of Representatives and the Senate. Previously, an overall majority would have been enough, which could have in theory allowed a near unanimity of Flemish representatives to impose an abolition of the facilities against the unanimous wish of the French-speaking representatives. This revision of the Constitution was widely seen by French speakers as a recognition that language facilities had permanent status.

== Implementation ==
Currently, both Dutch and French speakers complain about poor or absent respect by certain authorities for their linguistic rights. Belgian and European courts are frequently solicited to arbitrate. Related political debates often take place in the various Belgian assemblies i.e. the federal, regional and community Parliaments.

=== Schools ===
In accordance with Article 6 of the Act on linguistic arrangements in educational matters promulgated on 30 July 1963 and Article 3 of the Royal Decree of 14 March 1960 (implementing Article 4 of the law of 29 May 1959 to which it refers): nursery and primary education may be organised in another national language than the official language of the linguistic area under the condition that:

- at least 16 heads of households residing in the same municipality make an official request for such a school;
- the language most commonly used by their children to be provided with schooling is the considered language
- there is no school providing education in that language at less than 4 kilometres.

Since the 1988 reform which transferred educational matters from the federal government's level to the Communities’ level, the hosting Community is responsible for financing schools that meet the above criteria. However, the finances come from a special federal fund, which is shared between Communities according to the number of schools/pupils they respectively have in charge under the above legal arrangements. Annual subvention: nearly 10 million euros.

In conformity with the above legal arrangements:

- The Dutch-speaking Community finances nine French-speaking nursery and primary schools for French speakers in Drogenbos (1), Linkebeek (1), Sint-Genesius-Rode (2), Wemmel (1), Kraainem (1), Wezembeek-Oppem (2), and Ronse (1).
- The French-speaking Community finances a Dutch-speaking nursery and primary school for Dutch speakers in Mouscron.

In addition, the Decree of the Belgian French-speaking Community of 13 July 1998 and subsequent decrees and circulars on the organisation of education authorise schools which are funded by the French-speaking Community to offer language immersion education. In 2011, the French-speaking Community finances 152 nursery and primary schools and 101 secondary schools providing such type of education in Wallonia and Brussels. Out of them, 118 nursery and primary schools and 76 secondary schools use Dutch as language of immersion and 16 are located in municipalities with language facilities for Dutch speakers:

- 8 nursery and primary schools with Dutch language immersion in Mouscron (3), Comines-Warneton (1) and Enghien (2).
- 8 secondary schools with Dutch language immersion in Mouscron (4), Comines-Warneton (1) and Enghien (3).

Apart from the above, there are also:

- 1 small private Dutch-speaking nursery and primary school in the Walloon municipality of Comines-Warneton. Since the above legal criteria to establish such a school had not been met, it is financed by the Dutch-language Community.
- 1 special French-speaking school for sick children (falling under a different law) in the Flemish municipality (not with language facilities) of De Haan, linked with the paediatric medical centre of Zeepreventorium. It is financed by the Dutch-language Community.

In 2011, Dutch-speaking schools in Wallonia and French-speaking schools in Flanders are respectively inspected by Dutch- and French-speaking school inspectors. In 2007, the Flemish government decided that French-speaking schools in Flanders should be inspected by Flemish inspectors but the Constitutional Court canceled this decision in 2010 for the municipalities with language facilities around Brussels and confirmed its judgment in 2011 while extending it to all Flemish municipalities with language facilities for French speakers.

=== Communication and translation ===
The language facilities are regulated by the Belgian laws promulgated on 8 November 1962 and 2 August 1963. The administration of municipalities with facilities is internally monolingual (the administration works in one language) and externally bilingual (it communicates with the population in two languages). Until the 1990s, these laws were implemented in addressing the local residents in their own respective languages and in publishing public notices in both languages.

In the late 1990s, two Flemish ministers (Leo Peeters and Luc Vandenbrande) proposed a stricter interpretation of the above laws and instructed the Flemish municipalities with facilities for the French speakers to send all documents only in Dutch and to provide a French translated version only to people who would place an individual formal request which should be renewed for every document. These instructions sharpened the practice until then condoned by the Permanent Commission for Language Control, a joint commission set up by the law to control the correct application of the language laws in Belgium.

French speakers asked the Council of Europe to advise on the general situation of protection of national minorities in Belgium and petitioned for the Flemish Region to restore the previous practice. In 2002, after having sent various representatives to investigate the situation, the Parliamentary Assembly of the Council of Europe adopted Resolution 1301 (2002) on Protection of minorities in Belgium supporting French speakers' claim to be recognised as a "national minority" in the Flemish region, like Dutch speakers and German speakers in Wallonia. However, this assembly has a moral advisory role and not authority to impose rules on its members.

Until now, neither the French-speaking authorities nor the German-speaking authorities have taken any formal step to restrict language facilities in a similar way for the Dutch/French/German speakers living in Walloon municipalities with language facilities. However, in 2005 the Flemish newspaper De Tijd pointed out that the documents sent to the residents of the Walloon municipality of Enghien were generally written only in French while including just a small note in Dutch asking the receiver to inform whether he/she wished to get a Dutch copy. Since then, the municipality has corrected this practice.

=== Courts ===
Belgian courts are extremely reluctant to arbitrate in all matters related to the linguistic and ethnic rights of the various ethnic and language groups in Belgium. An attempt was made in Belgium's highest administrative court: in 2004, the 12th Dutch Language Chamber of the Belgian Council of State judged that the Flemish interpretation of the linguistic laws did not contradict the aforementioned laws. French speakers have generally considered that this ruling was politically motivated; and have kept demanding that the Flemish interpretation of linguistic laws be softened and that Belgium ratifies the Framework Convention for the Protection of National Minorities as per the Council of Europe's recommendations (a demand presently not approved by Flemish political parties).

=== Recent trends ===
Over time, Flemings have become dissatisfied by the continued and growing presence of French speakers in the "rim" municipalities around Brussels. As a result, there is now a strong and growing reaction in Flanders demanding that the current language facilities should be phased out, especially for the recent 'migrants' around Brussels. For the facilities in the municipalities with historic minorities on the Walloon–Flemish border, there is still a willingness to consider maintaining them on condition of reciprocity (that these facilities are also properly implemented in Wallonia).

French speakers want to maintain all current facilities in Flanders, the more militant wing wanting to extend them in scope and/or area. French-speaking political parties, especially, protested against the Flemish ministerial circular letters from the socialist minister Leo Peeters (see supra). These circular letters, various additional restrictions put on the use of French in those municipalities, and the claims made by more and more Flemish politicians for the abolition of the facilities have caused a radicalisation of part of the French speakers, many of whom now think their linguistic rights would be better protected if the "rim" municipalities joined the bilingual Brussels-Capital Region. At the same time, French speakers from the civil society like Professor Philippe Van Parijs and French speakers among the members of the Brussels Enterprises Commerce and Industry Association (BECI) made proposals meant at addressing these issues (among others) while addressing at the same time Flemish concerns and demand for respect of the Flemish 'principle of territoriality'.

== List ==
=== Flanders ===
==== Dutch-speaking municipalities with facilities for French speakers ====
In Flanders, there are two kinds of municipalities with facilities. Rim municipalities are situated in the Flemish rim around the Brussels-Capital Region and form part of Flemish Brabant. The other municipalities are called language border municipalities because they lie close to the border with Wallonia.

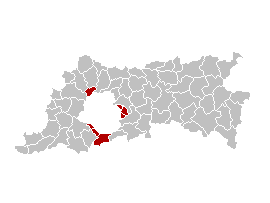
The municipalities with language facilities near Brussels

Rim municipalities:

- Drogenbos
- Kraainem (French, not common: Crainhem)
- Linkebeek
- Sint-Genesius-Rode (French: Rhode-Saint-Genèse)
- Wemmel
- Wezembeek-Oppem

Wezembeek-Oppem and Kraainem are sometimes referred to as the oostrand (eastern rim). A survey published in Le Soir on 14 February 2005, indicated that in all six rim municipalities, the majority of the population was French-speaking (the study was unofficial since the public authorities refuse to undertake a census). More precisely, the survey claimed that the French-speaking population amounts to 55% of the population in Drogenbos, 78% in Kraainem, 79% in Linkebeek, 58% in Sint-Genesius-Rode, 54% in Wemmel, and 72% in Wezembeek-Oppem.

Language border municipalities:

- Bever (French: Biévène)
- Herstappe
- Mesen (French: Messines)
- Ronse (French: Renaix)
- Spiere-Helkijn (French: Espierres-Helchin)
- Voeren (French: Fourons)

Although Sint-Genesius-Rode also borders Wallonia, it is considered a rim municipality rather than a border municipality.

=== Wallonia ===
==== French-speaking municipalities with facilities for Dutch speakers ====
- Comines-Warneton (Dutch: Komen-Waasten)
- Enghien (Dutch: Edingen)
- Flobecq (Dutch: Vloesberg)
- Mouscron (Dutch: Moeskroen)

==== French-speaking municipalities with facilities for German speakers ====
- Malmedy (German, not common: Malmünd)
- Waimes (German: Weismes)

==== French-speaking municipalities with limited educational provisions for both German and Dutch speakers ====
- Baelen
- Plombières (Dutch: Blieberg, German: Bleiberg)
- Welkenraedt (Dutch: Welkenraat, German: Welkenrath)

==== German-speaking municipalities with facilities for French speakers ====
All municipalities in the German-language community have French-language facilities:

- Amel (French: Amblève)
- Büllingen (French: Bullange)
- Burg-Reuland
- Bütgenbach (French: Butgenbach)
- Eupen (old French: Néau)
- Kelmis (French: La Calamine)
- Lontzen
- Raeren
- Sankt Vith (French: Saint-Vith)

== See also ==
- Municipalities in Belgium
- Francization of Brussels
- List of municipalities of the Brussels-Capital Region
- List of municipalities of the Flemish Region
- List of municipalities in Wallonia
- De Gordel
- Brussels-Halle-Vilvoorde
- Language legislation in Belgium
- French Language Services Act – similar legislation regarding French-language services in Ontario, Canada
- Framework Convention for the Protection of National Minorities
- European Charter for Regional or Minority Languages
