= Sint-Genesius-Rode =

Sint-Genesius-Rode: Rhode-Saint-Genèse (French)
- Municipality
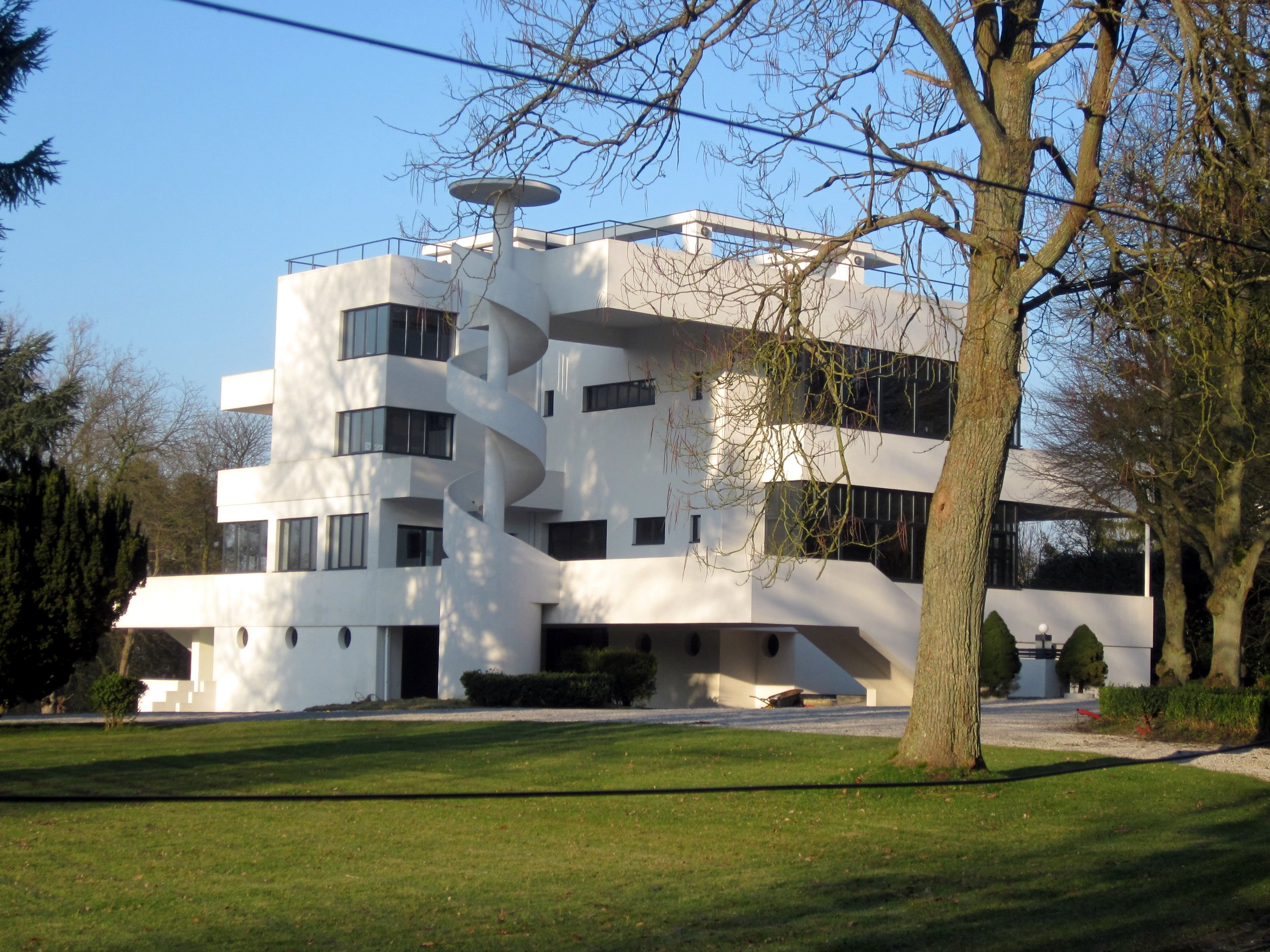

- Flag Coat of arms

- Location of Sint-Genesius-Rode in Flemish Brabant
- Interactive map of Sint-Genesius-Rode
- Location in Belgium
- Coordinates: 50°45′N 04°21′E
- Country: Belgium
- Community: Flemish Community
- Region: Flemish Region
- Province: Flemish Brabant
- Arrondissement: Halle-Vilvoorde

Government
  - Mayor: Pierre Rolin (IC-GB)
  - Governing parties: Intérêts Communaux – Gemeentebelangen, Engagement 1640

Area
  - Total: 22.75 km^{2} (8.78 sq mi)

Population (2018-01-01)
  - Total: 18,296
  - Density: 804.2/km^{2} (2,083/sq mi)
- Postal codes: 1640
- NIS code: 23101
- Area codes: 02
- Website: www.sint-genesius-rode.be

Sint-Genesius-Rode (Dutch: [sɪnt xeːˌneːzijʏs ˈroːdə]; (Note: In isolation, Genesius is pronounced [ɣeːˈneːzijʏs].) French: Rhode-Saint-Genèse [ʁɔd sɛ̃ ʒənɛz]) is a municipality in the province of Flemish Brabant, in the Flemish region of Belgium. The municipality only comprises the town of Sint-Genesius-Rode proper, and lies between Brussels and Waterloo in Wallonia. On January 1, 2008, Sint-Genesius-Rode had a total population of 18,021. The total area is 22.77 km^{2} (8.79 sq mi), which gives a population density of 791/km^{2} (2,050/sq mi). It borders the Brussels-Capital Region and is essentially a suburb of the city, contiguous with the Prince d'Orange neighbourhood (Uccle), and was a component of the short-lived Arrondissement of Brussels-Periphery. While the Brussels-Capital Region does not have a direct border with Wallonia, the shortest distance between the two is at Sint-Genesius-Rode municipality, with around 4 kilometres (2.5 mi) separating Prince d'Orange and Waterloo along the N5 road.

== Politics ==
The official language of the city is Dutch, historically the majority language of the population. However, Sint-Genesius-Rode is in linguistic flux, as it is one of the most evenly divided between the two languages. There is no linguistic census in Belgium, but based on the support Francophone parties receive, the French-speaking population of Sint-Genesius-Rode is estimated to be about 64%.

As in several other municipalities on the periphery of Brussels, in the 1960s linguistic facilities were given to local French-speaking residents. These mostly stemmed from Francophone workers employed in the neighbouring Brussels migrating to the area. These 'facilities' allow them the right to obtain and submit official documents from the local administration in French, as well as to conduct business with the authorities in the language of their choice. The regionalization of Belgium has maintained that compromise, though politicians representing French-speakers have interpreted these facilities as a permanent right for Francophones in the Brussels periphery. The Flemish viewpoint is that these facilities existed temporarily in order to assist those French-speakers who already had come to live there to help them integrate in the Flemish region and eventually learn the Dutch language.

Today, this particular municipality remains a controversial topic of local and national politics. On May 31, 2010, its city council voted a motion asking that it be reassigned from the Flemish Region to the Brussels Capital Region, in view of the majority of francophones residing there. A considerable number of Belgian French-speakers would like this to happen, thus creating a geographical link between Wallonia and Brussels. Francophone politicians propose this in exchange of the Flemish demand for the splitting of Brussels-Halle-Vilvoorde. The reassignment of the area is strongly opposed by most Flemish people, their politicians and their institutions, who argue that the borders of Belgium's regions should not be changed simply because many people move from one region to another. They see the incorporation of the territory into the Brussels Capital Region as a threat to the language and cultural rights of Flemish residents, and that a precedent would be set that would invite further Francophone migration to other municipalities with facilities. They also view this tendency as the extension of an already prevalent Francophone influence on the capital region.

Municipal elections have moved away from ideological contests to linguistic competitions. In 2018 the francophone list IC-GB won 69.3% of votes, defeating the Flemish-speaking unity list Engagement 1640 which won 30.7% of votes. No other parties participated.

== Notable people ==
- Paul Loicq (1888–1953), president of the International Ice Hockey Federation
- Herman van Rompuy (born 1947), Belgian politician and President of the European Council
- Family de Spoelberch, leaders of brewery AB InBev

== See also ==
- Municipalities with language facilities
- Von Karman Institute for Fluid Dynamics
