= Drogenbos =

- Municipality
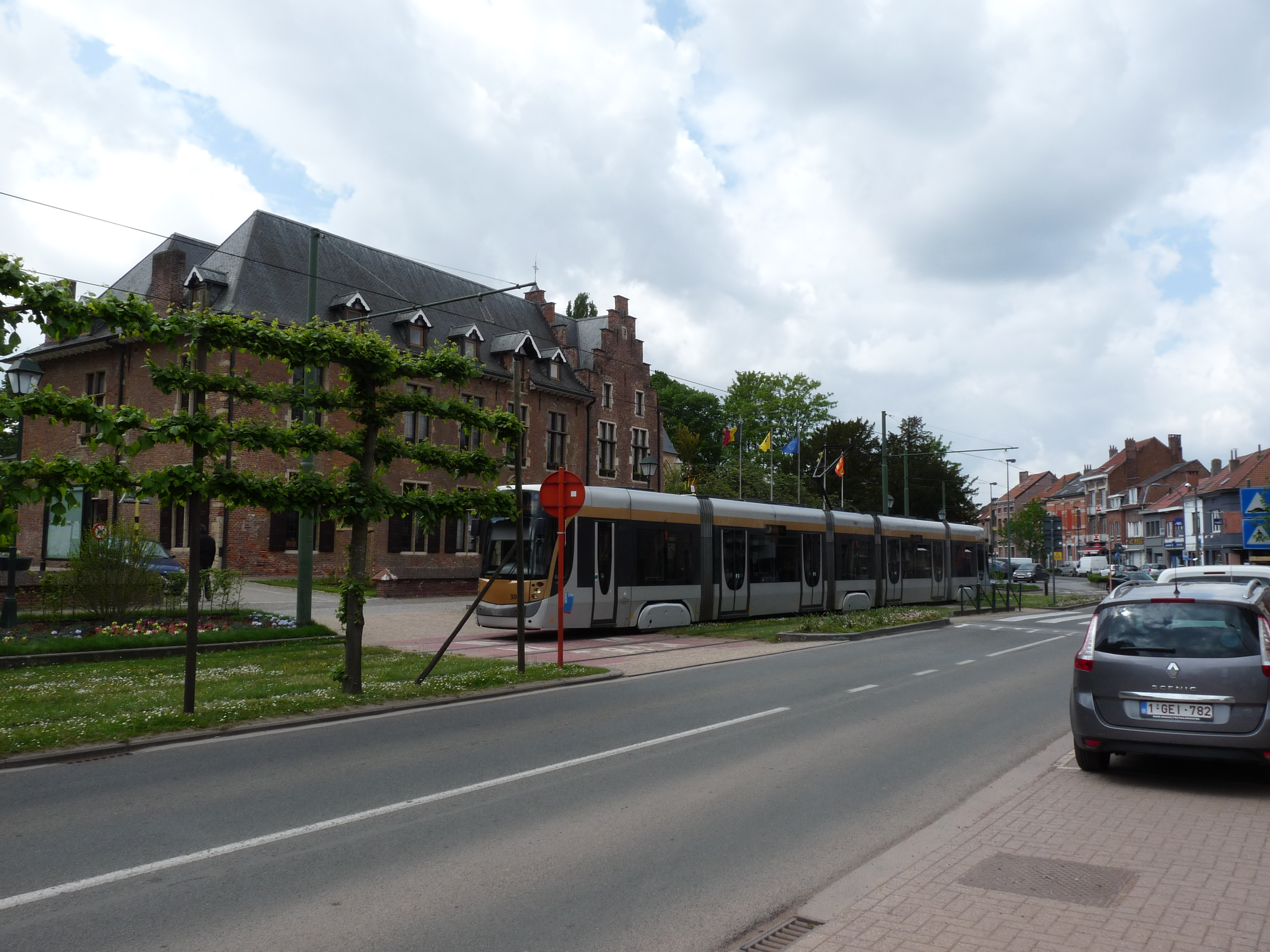

- Flag Coat of arms

- Location of Drogenbos in Flemish Brabant
- Interactive map of Drogenbos
- Location in Belgium
- Coordinates: 50°47′N 04°19′E
- Country: Belgium
- Community: Flemish Community
- Region: Flemish Region
- Province: Flemish Brabant
- Arrondissement: Halle-Vilvoorde

Government
  - Mayor: Alexis Calmeyn (Drogenbos Plus-LB)
  - Governing parties: Drogenbos Plus-LB, UF

Area
  - Total: 2.5 km^{2} (0.97 sq mi)

Population (2018-01-01)
  - Total: 5,599
  - Density: 2,200/km^{2} (5,800/sq mi)
- Postal codes: 1620
- NIS code: 23098
- Area codes: 02
- Website: www.drogenbos.be

Drogenbos (Dutch: [ˈdroːɣə(m)bɔs], French: [dʁoɡœnbɔs]) is a municipality in the province of Flemish Brabant, in the Flemish region of Belgium. The municipality only comprises the town of Drogenbos proper. On January 1, 2018, Drogenbos had a total population of 5,599. The total area is 2.49 km^{2} (0.96 sq mi), which gives a population density of 2,248/km^{2} (5,820/sq mi). It directly borders the Brussels-Capital Region and is part of the city's urban sprawl, contiguous with Calevoet (Uccle) – it was a component of the short-lived Arrondissement of Brussels-Periphery.

The official language of Drogenbos is Dutch, as in the rest of Flanders. Local French-speakers (77% of the population) enjoy linguistic facilities.

== Famous inhabitants ==
- Joseph Loeckx, comic artist, pseudonym Jo-El Azara
- Charles Theodore, Elector of Bavaria, Duke of Bavaria
- Felix De Boeck (1898–1995), painter; a museum of his work opened in 1995
