= Hypothetical partition of Belgium =

Hypothetical split of the country into Wallonia and Flanders

The partition of Belgium is a hypothetical situation, which has been discussed by both Belgian and international media, envisioning a split of Belgium along linguistic divisions, with the Flemish Community (Flanders) and the French-speaking Community (Wallonia) becoming independent states. Alternatively, it is hypothesized that Flanders could join the Netherlands (Greater Netherlands movement) and Wallonia could join France (Rattachist movement) or Luxembourg. Both communities have a large degree of autonomy within the Belgian federation. Complicating questions of partition are the status in a partitioned Belgium of Brussels (an autonomous bilingual region, majority-francophone but with a large contingent of Dutch speakers, geographically located in the Flemish half of the country) and the minority German-speaking Community.

== Background ==
The territories corresponding to the modern Belgian, Dutch and Luxembourgish states are collectively called the Low Countries. They emerged at the end of the Middle Ages as a set of more or less independent fiefdoms loosely linked to the Kingdom of France and the Holy Roman Empire. The southern part of this region—the Southern Netherlands, the Prince-Bishopric of Liège, the Imperial Abbey of Stavelot-Malmedy and the Duchy of Bouillon—was partitioned both politically into many fiefdoms, and linguistically into the Romanic and Germanic Sprachräume. The feudal borders did not match the linguistic borders, and some fiefdoms were divided into Francophone and Germanic regions. However, the ruling aristocracy, which usually spoke languages other than the population, did not much bother about these language-related disparities. After the 1581 secession of the Dutch Republic in the northern Low Countries, French progressively emerged in the Southern Netherlands under the influence of the Habsburg nobility and, later, of the French invasions, as the upper class language, not only at the court but also in the administration and in the political circles.

Antagonism between speakers of French and Dutch increased after the independence of Belgium in 1830, when residents of the Southern Netherlands rebelled against the newfound hegemony of the northern provinces of the United Kingdom of the Netherlands. Major European powers were divided in opinion over the fallout of the revolution. Ultimately, the state of Belgium, composed of provinces of both French-speaking and Dutch-speaking people, gained independence as a buffer state between France and the Netherlands. French became the sole official language. Dutch speakers demanded equal rights beginning in the late 19th century, but these were only introduced gradually throughout the 20th century. While postage stamps became bilingual in 1893, it was not until 1967 that an official Dutch version of the Constitution was accepted. Since independence, socio-economic imbalances have fueled resentment between the two communities.

Since the 1960s, separate regions have been created based on the country's linguistic division. As a result, minorities in certain areas (in and around Brussels and along the language border) claim to be disenfranchised in local government and services. Along with the usual left–right political division, there is also a linguistic division, causing a double party system which complicates coalition creation on the national level. The crisis over the formation of a coalition government in the aftermath of the 2007 elections, coupled with the unsolved problem of the Brussels-Halle-Vilvoorde electoral district and the rise of extremist political parties, has given a fresh impetus to the issue, with recent opinion polls showing sizable support for a partition. However, support for a unified state remains among the majority of Belgium's people. Unitarists claim that the monarchy, strong national institutions, and the geopolitical importance of the linguistically and ethnically mixed Brussels serve as unifying elements, while separatists rather claim these factors (and the considerable state debt) serve merely as obstacles to an inevitable partition. Some political observers have suggested that a possible partition of Belgium may be a blow to the European Union model of diverse cultures working together.

According to a 2019 opinion poll by the Flemish newspaper Het Belang van Limburg, 28.4% of the population supports a partition of Belgium whereas 62.7% opposes it; the remaining 8.8% having no opinion; ignoring those without opinion, this would leave 31.2% in favour and 68.8% opposed to partition. However, the opinion poll was limited to the Flemish province of Limburg, which is considered somewhat less Flemish nationalist, especially compared to Antwerp Province.

== Regional demographics ==
Communities: Flemish Community Flemish and French Community French Community German-speaking Community

Regions: Flanders Brussels-Capital Wallonia

As no census exists, there are no official statistics on Belgium's three official languages or their dialects. Various criteria, including the language(s) of parents, of education, or the second-language status of foreign born, may affect suggested figures. An estimated 59% of the Belgian population speaks Dutch (often colloquially referred to as Flemish), and French is spoken by 40%. Total Dutch speakers number 6.23 million, concentrated in the northern Flanders region, while French speakers comprise 3.32 million in Wallonia and an estimated 870,000 (85%) of the officially bilingual Brussels-Capital Region. The German-speaking Community is made up of 73,000 people in the east of Wallonia; around 10,000 German and 60,000 Belgian nationals are speakers of German. Roughly 23,000 more German speakers live in municipalities near the official Community.

Languages spoken at home in the Brussels Capital Region in 2006 French only French and Dutch French and a language other than Dutch Dutch only Neither French nor Dutch

The Capital Region having bilingual status obliges its authorities to attend to people and organisations in French or Dutch language as these prefer, and to show street names in both languages on the plates, but does not allow a bilingual school as education belongs to either the French Community or the Flemish one. Geographically, it is an enclave in the Flemish Region, though near Wallonia. Constitutionally, it is a politically distinct Region, while within its boundaries both the Flemish and French Communities exercise their authority. Historically, the local language of Brussels was Dutch, and Dutch remained the vernacular language of a majority of inhabitants until around 1950.

Dutch is mainly spoken by approximately 150,000 residents, or a 15% minority, at most. The city has strong economic ties with surrounding Flanders, and many Dutch-speakers commute to Brussels for work; but, at the same time, the expanding suburbs of Brussels led to a majority of French-speakers in six Flemish villages.

== Feudal borders ==
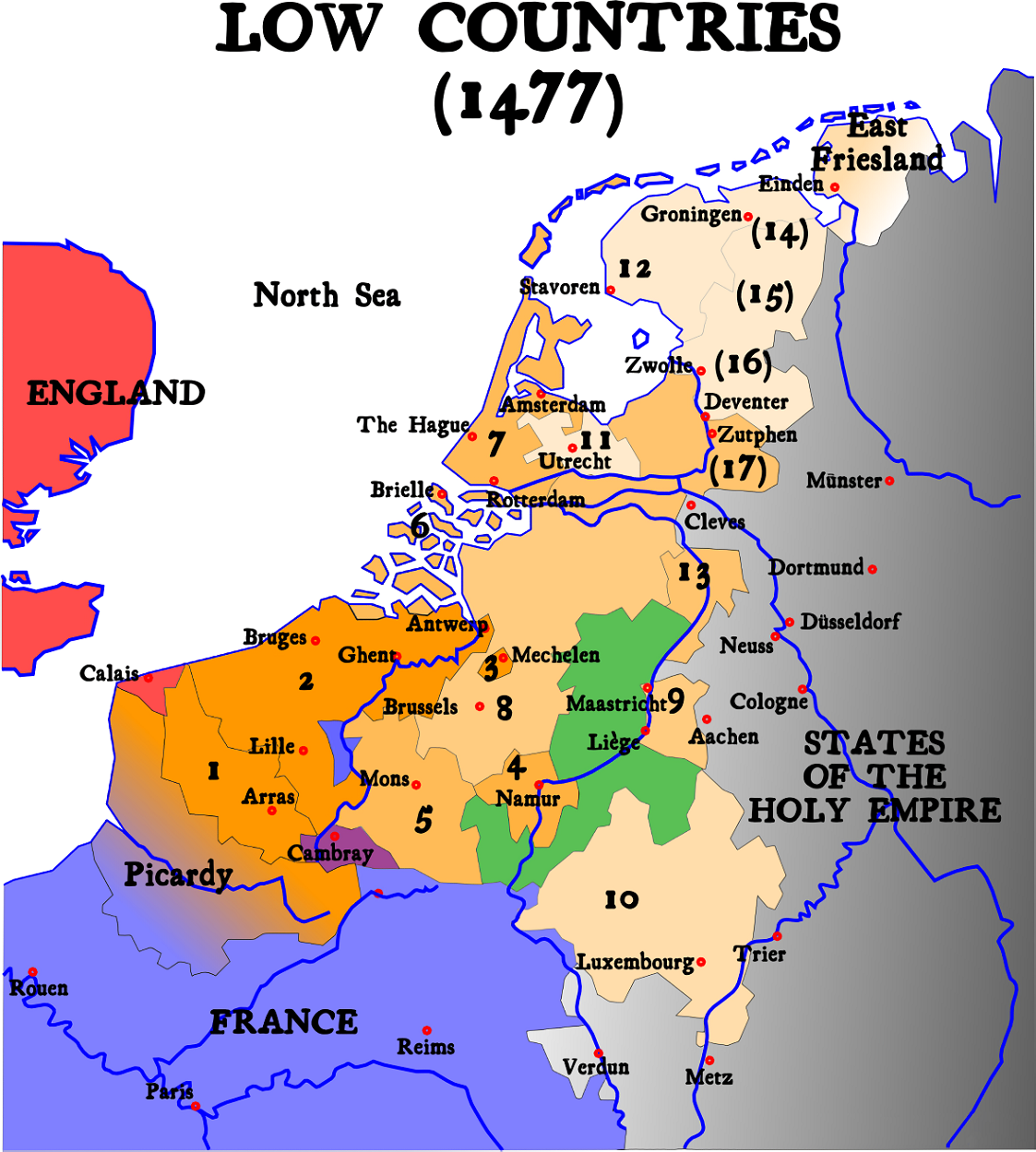
The Seventeen Provinces (orange, brown and yellow areas) and the Prince-Bishopric of Liège (green)

The territory of Belgium is the southern part of the historical region called the Low Countries. The Low Countries emerged at the end of the Middle Ages as a very loose political confederation of fiefdoms ruled in personal union by the House of Habsburg: the Seventeen Provinces. The largest components of this union were the Duchy of Brabant, the County of Flanders, the County of Hainaut and the Duchy of Luxembourg. The Prince-Bishopric of Liège was almost an enclave within the Seventeen Provinces. The prince-bishopric was not formally included in the Habsburgs' dominion but was, since the time of Emperor Charles V, strongly influenced by its Habsburg neighbors. The border which emerged after the Dutch Revolt and the Eighty Years' War split the Seventeen Provinces into the Dutch Republic and the Spanish Netherlands. In particular Brabant and Flanders were divided into northern and southern components. Though the fiefdoms constituting the Southern Netherlands were more or less ruled by a single reigning House, they were all quite distinct. Different traditions and dialects of Dutch and Walloon appeared. Within the largest fiefdoms like Liège, Flanders and Luxembourg, several distinct languages and dialects were in use.

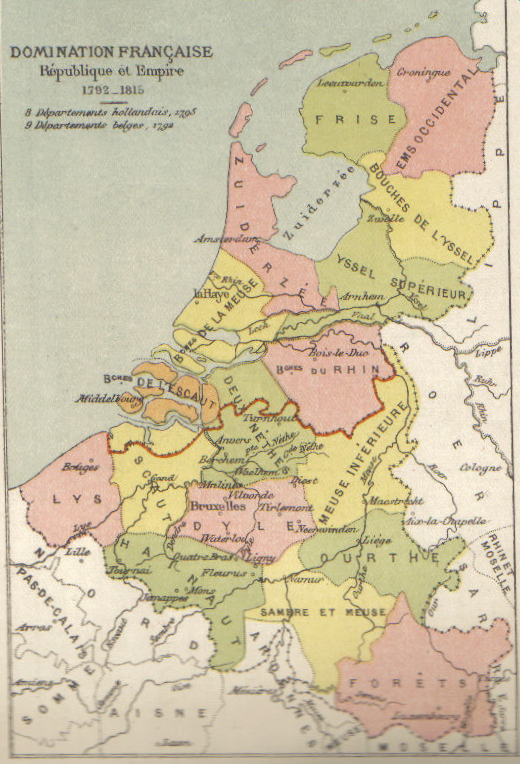
Map of French Imperial departments in the Low Countries

The feudal borders partitioning Belgium during the Ancien Régime have nothing in common with the partitioning lines which currently separate the Belgian federal entities. The French disbanded these feudal entities and replaced them with departments during the French occupation from 1794 to 1815. The new entities or departments mirrored, approximately, the language border. For instance the new division separated the bilingual kernel of the Prince-Bishopric of Liège into two more or less monolingual regions. The only major exceptions were the bilingual Dyle and Forêts departments. The departments would eventually become the provinces of the United Kingdom of the Netherlands and later on of Belgium. The name of the provinces were inspired by the roughly corresponding medieval fiefdoms. In particular, the Dyle department became the province of Brabant, that is the most southern part of the older duchy of Brabant.

In 1815, the territory now constituting Belgium was incorporated into the United Kingdom of the Netherlands, which had been created to rehabilitate and consolidate the former Seventeen Provinces and serve as a buffer against any expansionist ambitions of France. However, this placed the Catholic Belgian provinces, including French-speaking Wallonia, under Dutch-majority rule and a Calvinist Dutch king. The Belgians had little influence over their lives and resented Dutch control and domination over economic, political and social institutions, sentiment that culminated in revolution in 1830.

The Flahaut partition plan, proposed by France in 1830

Major European powers (which included France, Prussia and the United Kingdom) were divided over their response to the revolution of the Belgian people against the Dutch royal authorities. France favored the secession of Belgium from the Netherlands, hoping to annex all or at least part of the area, which was also the aim of most of the Belgian insurgents. After this proposal had been rejected by the other European powers, which supported the continued union of the Netherlands, Charles de Flahaut, a French diplomat, proposed a partition of the Southern Netherlands (most areas of modern Belgium). To this end, the parts of the provinces of Liège, of Limburg and of Namur east of the Meuse river as well as the cities of Maastricht and Liège and the Grand Duchy of Luxembourg would go to Prussia. Part of the province of East Flanders, nearly all of the province of Brabant, the province of Hainaut and the province of Namur west of the Meuse would be assigned to France. The province of Antwerp—except the city of Antwerp itself—and the province of Limburg, west of the Meuse river—except Maastricht—would remain with the Netherlands, as would a small part of the province of Brabant, the former Oranje Lordship of Diest. West Flanders, most of East Flanders, including Zeelandic Flanders, and the city of Antwerp were to form the Free State of Antwerp, under British protection.

However, this plan was rejected as absurd by the French ambassador to the United Kingdom, Talleyrand, who cited the danger posed by a British base on the European mainland. Belgium was subsequently established as an independent Kingdom. According to Flemish and Walloon nationalists, it was established as a ‘buffer state’ to check the ambitions of France. Wallonia and Flanders did not exist in 1830. The National Congress of the Kingdom chose a German prince, Leopold I of Saxe-Coburg-Gotha, as the Head of State. A historian of the Belgian revolution said that "in Belgium, there are parties and provinces, but no nation. Like a tent erected for one night, the new monarchy, after sheltering us from the tempest, will disappear without a trace." This opinion is however not shared by the overwhelming majority of historians.

== Language border ==
The language border separating the Germanic and Romance Sprachräume moved over the centuries which preceded the establishment of the Belgian state over an area between the Ardennes and the more or less straight line going from Aachen to Calais on the one hand and the much less populated frontier from Aachen to Arlon via Malmedy. However, this frontier has not much changed since the 18th century. For example, in the communes of Mouscron and Comines-Warneton, French seems to be dominant at least since 1761. The frontier splitting the older province of Brabant and the Hesbaye moved regularly during the 17th and 18th centuries. Some communes, such as Hélécine, switched from Dutch to French and others, such as Herstappe, switched from French to Dutch. The Voeren have a long Flemish tradition and, in the Land of Herve, several communes which used to use Germanic dialects switched to French during the 18th century, as for example, Berneau and Warsage, both now part of Dalhem and Saint-Jean-Sart, a hamlet of Aubel.

Prior to the 20th century, this language border did not merely distinguish speakers of Belgian French, standard Dutch and standard German, as today, but between Romance and Germanic dialect continua. The Germanic Sprachraum was made of different components such as West Flemish, East Flemish, Brabantic, Limburgish, Ripuarian, Moselle Franconian dialect of Trier and Luxembourgish. The Romance sprachraum was made of Picard, Walloon (with four distinct dialects around the cities of Charleroi, Namur, Liège and Bastogne), Lorrain and Champenois. Due to mass education and the expansion of modern media such as television, the mid-20th century saw a uniformization of the different language regions, leading to the domination of the standard languages in their respective domains. In Wallonia, French became the dominant, priority language (local dialects being seldom used). Elsewhere in the Low Countries, the local dialects survived better, at least in private use.

The historical language border in the Low Countries corresponds to the frontier between populations whose majorities spoke distinct languages. However, the ruling upper classes most often spoke French. As was the case in many European noble courts, French was historically the nobility's language. This was also the case most of the rest of the Low Countries. Several sovereigns of the region, notably including Maria Theresa of Austria, succeeded in making French not only the language of the court but also of their administrations. For instance, while the major part of the population of Luxembourg speaks Luxembourgish in a private context, the administrative language of Luxembourg is French. As another example, the motto of the Kingdom of the Netherlands is the French phrase: "Je maintiendrai", because the language of the Orange-Nassau reigning family was French until 1890. In Flanders, until the beginning of the 20th century, many upper class Flemish burghers, such as Maurice Maeterlinck or Suzanne Lilar, used French as their first language. Another example is the University of Ghent which was a French-speaking institution until 1930.

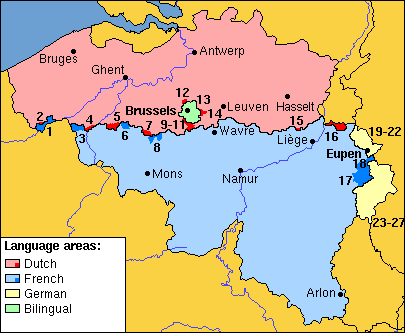
The official language border as defined since 1963. The municipalities with language facilities, shaded darker. All of the German area has language facilities.

The language areas were established in 1963. The division into language areas was included into the Belgian Constitution in 1970. The border between the language areas is the so-called Belgian language or linguistic border. It is based on the actual language border between the sprachräume but is not utterly identical. Through constitutional reforms in the 1970s and 1980s, regionalisation of the unitary state led to a three-tiered federation: federal, regional, and community governments were created, a compromise designed to minimize linguistic, cultural, social and economic tensions. The authority of the Regions and Communities is limited to some language areas:

- Flanders to the Dutch language area, Wallonia to the French and German language areas, Brussels to the bilingual language area,
- the Flemish Community to the Dutch and bilingual language areas, the French Community to the French and bilingual language areas, and, the German-speaking Community to the German language area.

This territorial issue, in particular around Brussels, is a source of tension between the Belgian communities.

== Nationalisms and regionalisms ==
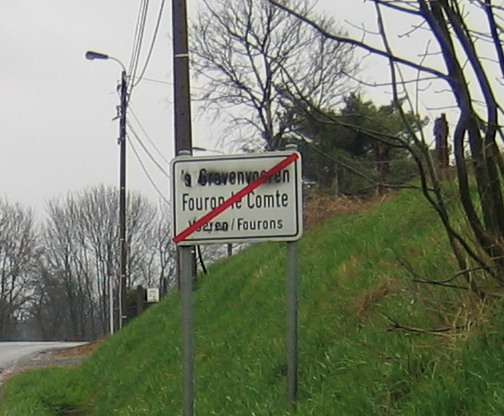
Bilingual road sign in Voeren, a Belgian municipality with language facilities bordering the Netherlands. The Dutch name (Voeren) has been painted over, leaving the French name (Fourons) only

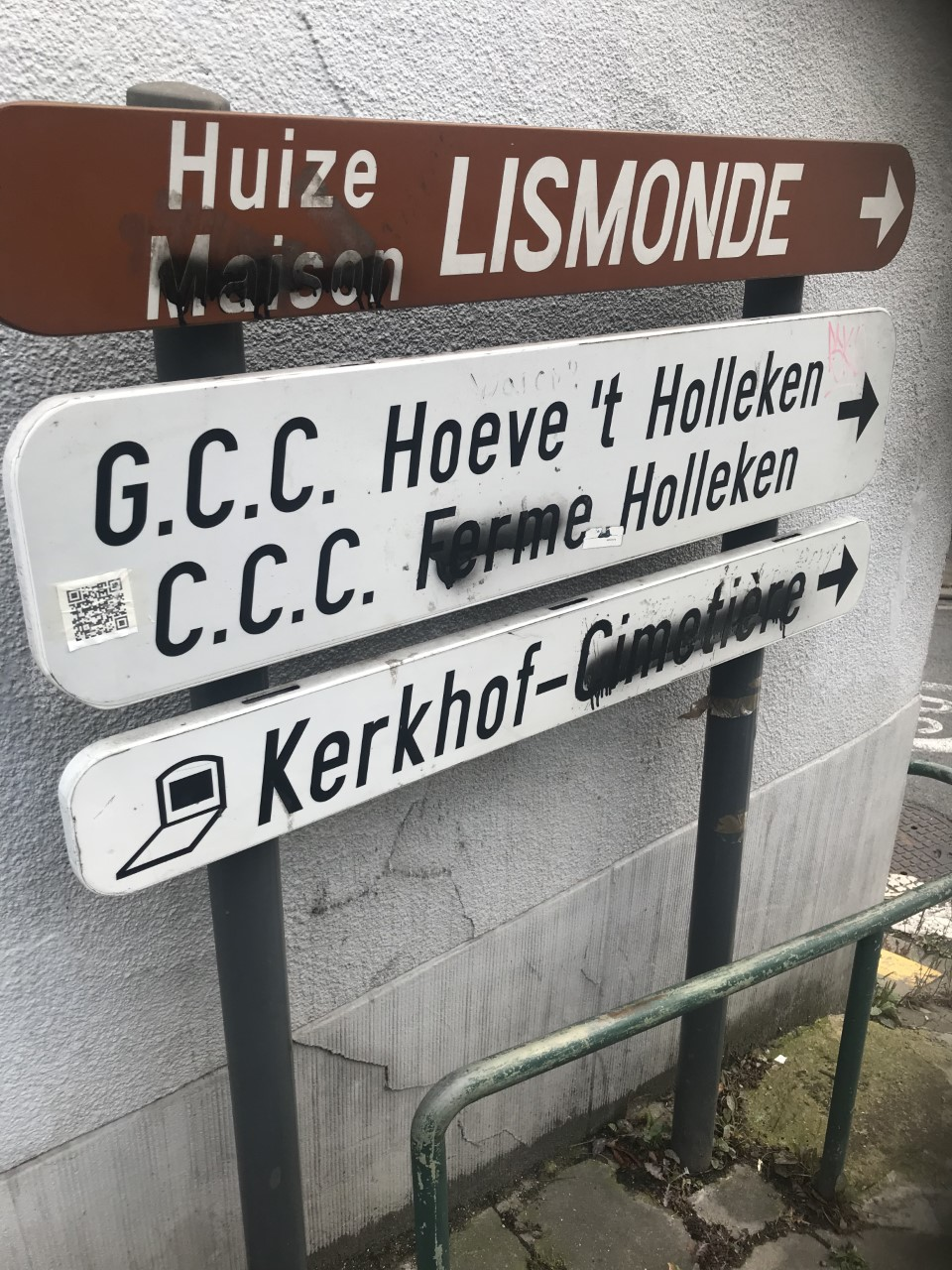
Bilingual road sign in Linkebeek, a Belgian municipality with language facilities bordering Brussels. The French words have been painted over, leaving the Dutch words only

=== Belgian nationalism ===
Currents of Belgian nationalism began to emerge in the late 19th century, seeking to overcome the ethnic and linguistic divide and create a national culture. Historian Henri Pirenne asserted that Belgian identity was not defined on racial, ethnic or linguistic lines, but in the civilizational community of the Belgian people. Supporters of a partition of Belgium argue that the synchronized attempts to forge a national identity and culture have been unable to forestall ethno-linguistic rivalries.

=== Flemish movement ===
French was the only official language of Belgium until 1898, even though Flanders was and still is predominantly Dutch-speaking. The government's long refusal to acknowledge Dutch as an official language led to hostilities between Flanders and the French-speaking bourgeoisie who held both political and economic power. These hostilities gave rise to the Flemish movement, which began as a literary and cultural organization, but later became a political movement that called for legal recognition of Dutch and for social emancipation of the Flemish people. The 1898 Equality Law made Dutch an official language of Belgium, but it did not become the sole official language of Flanders until 1921. The Francization of Brussels was at that time in full expansion. To this day, French remains the language of the aristocracy.

While a Walloon industrial and mining base developed during the 19th century, the largely agrarian Flanders area trailed in socio-economic development, leading to widespread demands for regional autonomy and the correction of imbalances in taxation, social services, and representation. The deterioration of the Walloon industrial base in the late 20th century occurred parallel to the growth of service and technological industries in Flanders, aggravating socio-economic tensions. Modern Fleming demands center over the alleged over-taxation of Flanders and insufficient autonomy and complaints over the concentration of social services in Wallonia, causing a so-called "stream of money" from Flanders to Wallonia. The Flemish movement has inspired the growth of Flemish nationalist political parties such as the Volksunie (People's Union) which split into different parties including the Vlaams Blok (succeeded by the Vlaams Belang), the New Flemish Alliance (N-VA) and FlemishProgressives. While the N-VA seeks greater autonomy and favours the independence of Flanders, possibly in a confederate state, the Vlaams Belang is more clearly separatist.

=== Walloon/Francophone movement ===
The Walloon movement arose in the 19th century along with the language disputes; French-speakers sought the preservation of the French language and culture as the defining creed of the country. French-speaking politicians (who were sometimes elected in Flanders) and other influential citizens opposed the Flemish demands for the recognition of Dutch and wished to maintain a centralized government to prevent regionalization. On the other hand, the Walloon politician Jules Destrée reacted in 1912 to the process of minorisation of Wallonia and asked explicitly for a splitting of Belgium along linguistic lines. However, Destrée was using the word separation in French in the sense of federalization (French: séparation administrative), and not in the sense of complete partition. The New York Times explained that Destrée was afraid of the domination of the Flemings within Belgian institutions.

Government composition, 1884–1911
Governments	From	To	Flemish ministers	Ministers from Brussels	Walloon ministers
A. Beernaert	26 October 1884	17 March 1894	60%	14%	26%
J. de Burlet	26 March 1894	25 June 1896	75%	9%	16%
P. de Smet de Naeyer (1)	26 June 1896	23 January 1899	87%	0%	13%
J. Vandenpeereboom	24 January 1899	31 July 1899	84%	0%	16%
P. de Smet de Naeyer (2)	5 August 1899	12 April 1907	76%	0%	24%
J. de Trooz	1 May 1907	31 December 1907	67%	11%	22%
F. Schollaert	9 January 1908	8 June 1911	57%	22%	21%
Ch. de Broqueville	18 June 1911	4 August 1914	42%	22%	36%

Map of France plus Wallonia and Brussels (red), as advocated by rattachists. Note that the German-speaking community is also included here.

The Flemish historian Maarten van Ginderachter wrote that the Walloons were "excluded from the national power, between 1884 and 1902 there was only one Walloon in the Belgian government at any time".

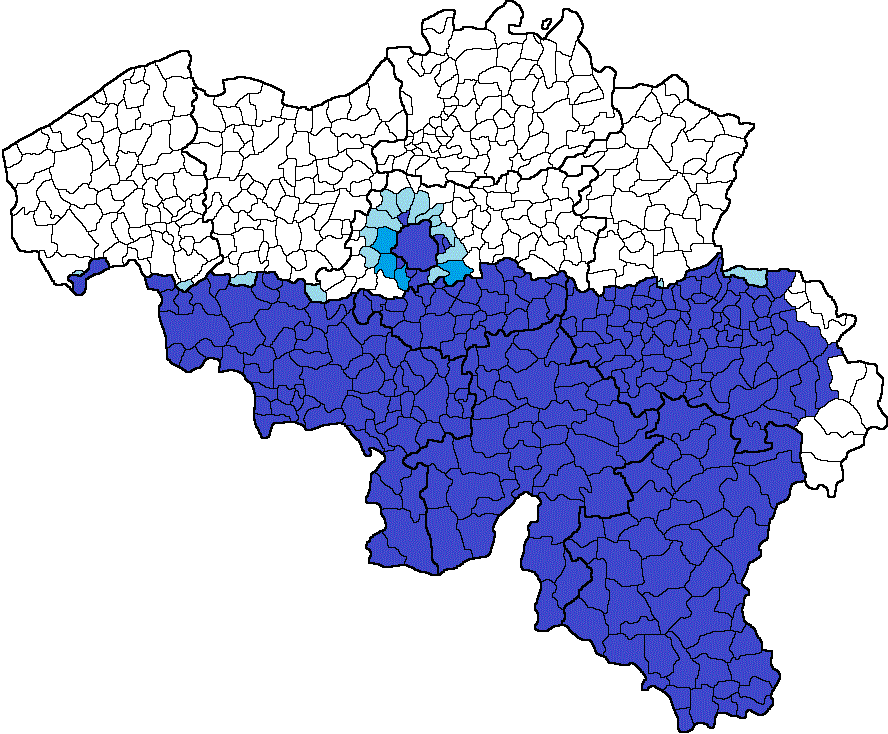
Map of French-speaking areas in Belgium. >50% French speakers 30 to 50% French speakers 10 to 30% French speakers

After the division of Belgium into two clearly separate linguistic areas, and after the economic decline of Wallonia, two more or less separate currents have formed. One is a more regional Walloon movement, demanding to maintain the solidarity between the richer north and the poorer south, but also increasingly stressing the separate cultural identity of Wallonia. Another current is merely Francophone and pro-Belgian, but not regional as such, mainly based on the French-speakers of Brussels and especially of the surrounding rim municipalities which are effectively suburbs of Brussels but situated in Flanders. The two movements have in common the support of the French language, support of the Belgian state and opposition to further federal devolution. A minority of Walloons, however, support increased independence. Flemish nationalists have claimed that the French-speaking "Belgicists" of Brussels and its suburbs do not have common interests with the Walloons, but that these two parties have formed a quid-pro-quo alliance to oppose the Dutch-speaking majority. According to this analysis, Walloon politicians would allegedly give political support to the French-speaking politicians of Brussels (and its surroundings) in return for receiving economic support to Wallonia.

Since the 1960s, Belgian political parties and civic organizations have witnessed bifurcation of membership and organizations between Walloon and Flanders. Ethnic tensions affect the working of local governments, which often pass laws prohibiting the use of the language of the respective minority populations in official functions. For example, municipal council meetings in Flanders must take place in Dutch, even if a majority of the council is French-speaking. On the other hand, Dutch-speaking citizens of the Flemish municipalities close to Brussels claim their position is being undermined by the minority rights of French-speaking settlers. Significant pressures in living conditions have kept the two main communities separate and confined to their majority regions; stark ethnic and linguistic segregation has emerged in Brussels, the capital and largest city of the country. Ethnic tensions have affected some of the city's surrounding municipalities, which are situated in Flanders, but have had a great influx of monolingual French-speakers as a result of suburbanisation. These Dutch-speaking "facility municipalities" are obliged to offer local government services in French, meaning health-care and public amenities are divided on linguistic lines, and in some municipalities the original French-speaking minority is believed to have become a majority.

=== Brussels ===
Votes for Dutch speaking parties in Brussels in the Belgian federal election, 2010

The main reason for Brussels being mainly French-speaking was the low social prestige of the Dutch language in Belgium during the 19th century and the severe discrimination against both Dutch as a language and the Flemings. French was, at that time, the language of the administration, government, culture, law and education. From 1880 onwards, more and more Dutch-speaking people became bilingual and passed only French on to their children, resulting in a rise of monolingual French-speakers after 1910. Halfway through the 20th century, the number of monolingual French-speakers carried the day over the (mostly) bilingual Flemish inhabitants. Only since the 1960s, after the fixation of the Belgian language border and the socio-economic development of Flanders was in full effect, could Dutch stem the tide of increasing French use.

The status of Brussels in a partitioned Belgium is uncertain and a source of considerable debate.

Union with Flanders

One idea is that the city rejoins Flanders in which Brussels is geographically and economically embedded. Proposals include a guarantee that the linguistic rights of the French-speaking population in Brussels are safeguarded.

Union with Wallonia

Another idea is that Brussels would form a union with Wallonia, often referred to as Wallobrux. One problem is that the regions do not border each other, as Brussels is an enclave in Flanders. Some French-speaking politicians therefore demand that a corridor be made between the two territories (see the topic of the extension of Brussels below).

City-state scenario

Another idea is that Brussels would become a "European [capital] district", similar to Washington D.C. or the Australian Capital Territory, run by the EU rather than Flanders or Wallonia. Although there is precedent for such an arrangement — the Vatican City State is governed by the Holy See, which is a distinct entity from the Vatican City State under international law — the Union's structure has no experience at governing at this level at present. To fulfill this solution in practice, Brussels would probably need to be an independent city-state which could join the EU on equal footing with other EU member states. The possible status of Brussels as a "city-state" has been suggested by Charles Picqué, Minister-President of the Brussels-Capital Region, who sees a tax on the EU institutions as a way of enriching the city. However, the Belgian issue has generated very little discussion within the EU bodies.

Extension of Brussels

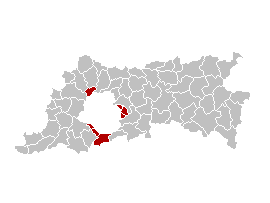
The six municipalities with language facilities in the periphery of Brussels (red) belong to the province Flemish Brabant (gray)

A controversial issue, complicating the "city-state" scenario, is the possible extension of the Brussels capital region into the surrounding municipalities within Flemish Brabant and Walloon Brabant. This proposal is not necessarily linked to a split-up of Belgium.

Some have, however, suggested that these wealthy areas would make the city financially viable as an independent state, potentially give it around 1.5 million inhabitants, an airport and forest within its boundaries, and make it three or four times larger than the current capital region. Currently, Brussels is the most important seat of EU institutions, but the EU has no formal capital. It has been claimed that a large and independent status may help Brussels advance its claim as the capital of the EU.

The enlargement of the Brussels capital region is supported by many French-speakers in the Flemish municipalities with facilities for French-speakers surrounding Brussels. As a result of suburbanisation and an influx of French-speakers and EU officials from Brussels, these municipalities have in recent decades become increasingly French-speaking to an extent that French-speakers now form a majority in some municipalities. In contrast, an extension of the bilingual region is out of the question for the Dutch-speaking inhabitants of these communities and for virtually all Flemish political parties, who say that these newer inhabitants should respect and adjust to the language of the region they are moving into. In fact the facilities now in place were initially established in order to ease the adaptation of the French-speaking to living in a Flemish area.

Similar to a "Greater Brussels" region, the electoral district of Brussels-Halle-Vilvoorde consisted of Brussels and 35 surrounding municipalities in Flanders. Prior to its dissolution, this district was the last remaining entity in Belgium that did not coincide with provincial borders, and as such had been deemed unconstitutional by the Belgian Constitutional Court. The district was a conflict issue for several years, and a major political problem in the cabinet formation crisis of 2007–2008. In July 2012, following the 2010–2011 Belgian government formation, Brussels-Halle-Vilvoorde was split into two parts as part of the sixth Belgian state reform.

Condominium

Another proposition is the establishment of a condominium of the Flemish and the French-speaking Communities of Brussels, where both sides would govern Brussels together for national and international issues. For all local territorial policies, Brussels would be fully autonomous. For all 'non-territorial' public services (as culture, welfare and education), each community would enjoy autonomy. This idea is in general popular among Flemish politicians, such as socialist politician Louis Tobback and nationalist Bart De Wever.

Such an arrangement existed for several centuries in Maastricht. Shortly after 1200 this city received dual authority, with the prince-bishops of Liège and the dukes of Brabant holding joint sovereignty over the city. In 1284, this dual authority was formally endorsed in a constitutional agreement, the 'Alde Caerte' ('Old Charter'). After some disputes in the interpretation, this was elaborated further in 1356 with the Doghter Caerte ('Daughter Charter'). These institutional arrangements then survived until the French Revolution.

This dual authority ensured a relatively stable and prosperous institutional environment for nearly six centuries (from 1204 till 1794). The citizens from Maastricht had to choose between the Brabant nationality (and jurisprudence) and the Liège nationality. Each had its own judges and public services. Something similar would be the case if Brussels became a condominium governed by the two major communities, the French-speakers and the Flemings.

=== German-speaking Community ===
The German-Speaking Community (yellow). The municipalities of Malmedy and Waimes belong to the French Community (light grey).

The small German-speaking Community of Belgium in the east is in fact more an observer than a player in the difficult negotiations between Flanders and Wallonia. The region of Eupen-Malmedy was given to Belgium in the aftermath of the First World War. (The former German city of Malmedy and the surrounding villages are Walloon and therefore are not part of the German-speaking Community.) The territory consists of two parts with a total area of about 850 km^{2} (330 sq mi). Apart from being linked by the route of the disused Vennbahn railway, which runs as a Belgian exclave through German territory, the two parts are not connected. Approximately 75,000 people live there. The conflict between Walloons and Flemings provided the German-speaking Community with considerable autonomy. Although the region is too small to play a role in the negotiations, it obtained an autonomy similar to that of its larger neighbors. The German-speaking Belgians now have a parliament and a government with four ministers and a minister-president.

Four theoretical scenarios are usually considered in the event that a partition of Belgium would occur: remaining with Wallonia, sovereign statehood, reattachment to Germany, or attachment to Luxembourg. The community is part of the Walloon Liège Province and, per se, would stay so in the event of partition. This status quo solution is the most probable, although it is uncertain whether or not the German-speakers could maintain their cultural and political rights in the long term in an otherwise monolingual francophone country. The other three possibilities would become realistic only if Wallonia were to seek unification with France. Since the community used to be part of Germany, "reunification" seems to be the logical step to take (the region borders the German states of North Rhine-Westphalia and Rhineland-Palatinate). However, opponents to this idea argue that the autonomy of the region would be lost in Germany as much as it would be in France, though giving the region the status of a German Bundesland could alleviate this issue (cf. Saarland). Because of the strong cohesion of the regional population, however, some would prefer the creation of an independent state. They argue that the new country would, for example, be five times as large and more than twice as populous as Liechtenstein. Opponents say this would lead to the creation of a new undesired tax haven. The last option would be to merge with Luxembourg. Supporters of this scenario underline that many from St. Vith currently commute to Luxembourg and that a union with the rich Grand Duchy would be economically profitable. However this would leave the northern part of the community around Eupen as an exclave of Luxembourg. Minister-president Karl-Heinz Lambertz is said to have supported such a project. He, however, has refuted this and has committed himself to the continued union with Belgium. In an interview with the German TV-channel ZDF in February 2011, he listed the four aforementioned options concerning the future of the German-speaking Community.

== 21st-century position of the political parties ==
Composition of the Belgian Chamber of Representatives after the 9 June 2024, general elections
Affiliation	Members	Language	Ideology
New Flemish Alliance	24	Dutch	Liberal conservatism & Belgian confederalism
Flemish Interest	20	Dutch	Far-right politics & Flemish separatism
Reformist Movement	20	French	Liberalism
Workers' Party of Belgium	15	Bilingual	Marxism & Unionism
Forward	13	Dutch	Social democracy
Socialist Party	16	French	Social democracy
Christian Democratic and Flemish	11	Dutch	Christian democracy
The Committed Ones	14	French	Social liberalism
Open Flemish Liberals and Democrats	7	Dutch	Liberalism & Social liberalism
Green	6	Dutch	Green politics
Ecolo	3	French	Green politics
Challenge	1	French	Regionalism & Liberalism
Total	150		

The parties with long lasting participation in the Belgian governments, that is the Christian Democrats, the Liberals and the Socialists, as well as the Green parties, usually refuse to speak openly about a possible partitioning of Belgium. This question seems to be taboo on the Belgian political scene and is discussed only from time to time by mainstream politicians in order to menace the other community, not unlike the atomic bomb threat during the Cold War context. In particular, on 6 September 2010, after long lasting negotiation for the formation of the federal government, most leaders of the French-speaking Socialist Party simultaneously declared that they now consider the partition of Belgium as a realistic alternative solution to the Belgian problems. This openly separatist point of view expressed by the French-speaking Socialists is analysed by some, including French-speaking liberals and most Flemish politicians, as an idle threat which aims at forcing progress in communitarian negotiations. The heart of the problem is not the partition of Belgium but its federalization also called regionalization or communitarization. This process of devolution, which began in the 1960s due to the pressure of the Flemish movement and, to a lesser extent, of the Walloon movement, is called in the Belgian context the state reform. While most Francophones argue that the state reform is unnecessary, virtually all Flemish political parties demand a severe reform of the Belgian state. In particular the N-VA and a part of the Flemish movement want to apply the so-called Maddens Doctrine in order to enforce the Francophones to require such a state reform.

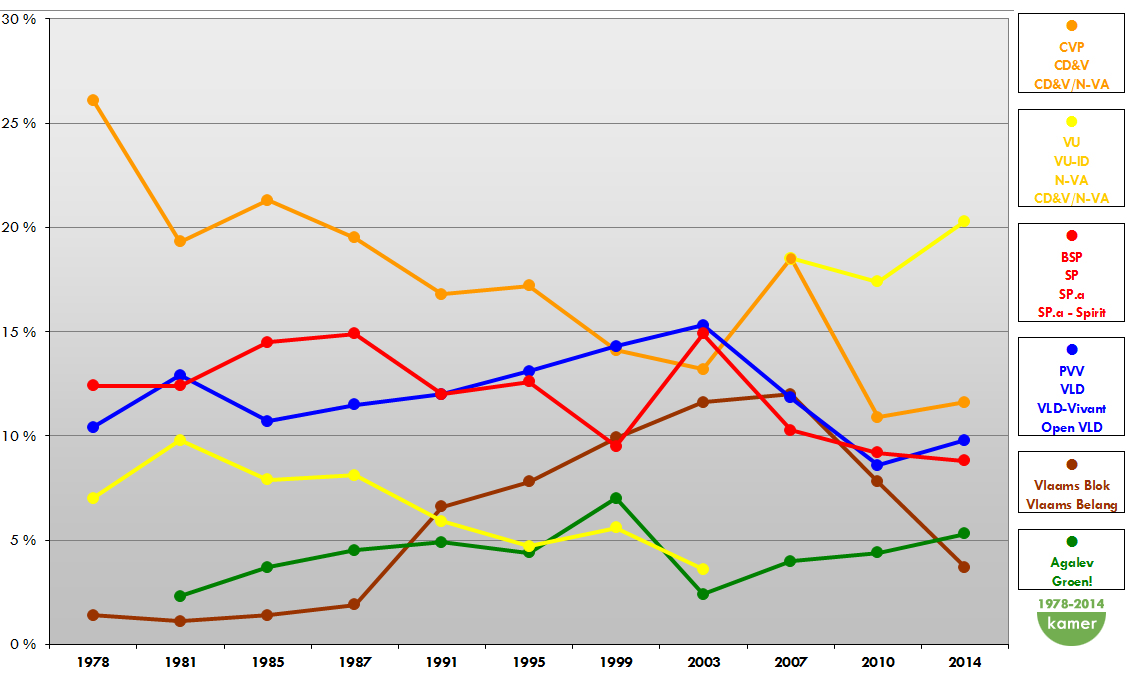
The relative weights of largest Flemish parties at the federal Chamber of Representatives. The largest Flemish separatist party was the Vlaams Blok/Vlaams Belang (VB) from 1991 to 2007. In the federal election 2010 and 2014, the largest separatist party was the New Flemish Alliance (N-VA). In 2007 the NVA was presenting a single list together with the Flemish Christian Democrats (CD&V). The more former moderate nationalist People's Union, whose heirs are the N-VA and the now defunct Spirit, is represented in the same color as its successor N-VA.

Socialist Party Different (sp.a), the Flemish socialist party, states on its website that it believes an independent Flanders is not necessary. It does support the devolution of a number of additional responsibilities, such as the railways or the policy of employment. Open Flemish Liberals and Democrats (Open VLD) want more socio-economic and financial autonomy for Flanders, a homogenous division of responsibilities, more cooperation between the communities and regions and a strong federal state. Green, the Flemish green party, wants another round in the state reform, but only if it leads to more solidarity, a better functioning of the institutions and more democracy. It states on its website that it does not want to reform for the purpose of reforming. Green wants Belgium to remain a federal state and considers the cooperation between different communities within one state to be a challenge rather than a problem. It also pleads for federal loyalty and respect for the rulings of the Constitutional Court and wants to see a more homogenous division of responsibilities.

The Francophone Socialist Party (PS) and Christian democrats (cdH) promote the conservation of the current Belgian welfare state, and therefore oppose any further regionalisation of the federal social policies. The Reformist Movement, the Francophone liberal party, stresses in its manifesto that the Flemings are intending to split most of the solidarity mechanisms that exist between the Belgians. They also state that they minimize the importance of the Brussels-Capital Region as a constitutional component of the federal state. Their approach is to build strong links between the different components of the French-speaking part of Belgium, including Brussels and Wallonnia as well as the municipalities with a French-speaking presence around Brussels and in Voeren. The aim of this approach is to create a strong autonomous Francophone component within the federal state. Écolo, the Francophone Green party, supports an improvement of the political links between the communities. They suggest, among other things, the creation of a national electoral arrondissement for the election of part of the federal parliament.

=== Outright support ===
In Flanders, several large parties openly call for a partition of the country. Until the 2010 federal elections, the largest was the far-right party Flemish Interest. Since 2010, the largest Flemish nationalist party in Belgium is the more moderate New Flemish Alliance (N-VA). N-VA does not openly advocate the partition of Belgium, instead proposing a confederalist solution, where the center of power would shift to the regional governments, while certain tasks such as e.g. the army, diplomacy or the national football competition would remain on the Belgian level. Another openly separatist moderate party that emerged in 2007 is List Dedecker, which was relatively successful in the 2007 federal and 2009 regional elections, winning several seats, but subsequently lost all of them again in the 2014 federal and regional elections, due to the large success of the N-VA . In Wallonia and Brussels, only the Wallonia-France Rally party is openly separatist. This party, which has no elected representative at either the national or regional level, promotes the partition of Belgium and a union of Wallonia and Brussels with France.

The far-left bilingual Workers' Party of Belgium (holding 10% of the seats at the 2024 federal parliament) supports the unity of Belgium since it considers the federalisation of the country as an employers' attack at the welfare state and the unity of the trade unions. Also, several small parties with no or very few seats at the parliament campaign explicitly for the unity of the Belgian state. The conservative Belgian Union promotes a stronger federal government and a return to the Belgian unitary state which existed in the 1960s. The Francophone far-right Front National is also explicitly opposed to the partition of Belgium.

There are several Walloon representatives of the Socialist Party in the Walloon Parliament who are in favour of the Walloon Regionalism, also in the Walloon Government such as Eliane Tillieux and Jean-Claude Marcourt for instance, i.e. two socialist ministers on the four of the Walloon Government. The Walloon wing of the General Federation of Belgian Labour are in favour of more powers for the Regions.

== 2007–11 Belgian political crisis ==
=== 2007 government formation ===
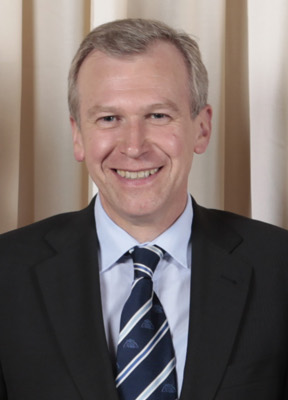
Yves Leterme (CD&V) won the 2007 federal election after an alliance with the separatist party N-VA.

The 2007 federal election resulted in no political party or coalition gaining enough seats to form a working majority. The crisis continued for 196 days, leaving Belgium without a government with a popular mandate. While prime minister Guy Verhofstadt's lame duck ministry remained in power as caretaker, several leading politicians were nominated without success by the King to build a stable governmental coalition. Flemish politician Yves Leterme had been the prime candidate to lead the national government, but a political gaffe would prove to be his undoing. Asked to sing the Belgian national anthem in French at National Day celebrations, instead of the Brabançonne Leterme started to sing the Marseillaise, France's anthem. Leterme's error drew condemnation from the different communities, aggravating distrust and separatist sentiments.

Eventually, after 196 days, the parties finally succeeded in forming a new government. In December 2008, another crisis related to the Fortis case, erupted, again destabilising the country and resulting in the resignation of Belgian Prime Minister Yves Leterme. The new Herman Van Rompuy-led government brought a brief period of fragile stability, but ended when Van Rompuy left his office to become the first full-term President of the European Council. The succeeding Leterme II government fell in April 2010 over the lack of progress on resolving the BHV issue.

Although most Flemish political parties describe their demands as limited to seeking greater regional autonomy and decentralization of government (save for members of the Vlaams Belang party, who called for a splitting of the country and claim of a national identity, culture and institutions, as well as claim Belgium is an "unnatural" and "artificial" state, formed simply as a buffer between France and other European powers during 19th century conflicts), some public opinion polls performed during the communautary crisis showed that approximately 46% of Flemish people support secession from Belgium. Other surveys indicated only 12% of the Flemings want the end of Belgium, whereas 37% want more responsibilities to be devolved to communities and the regions. Many French-speakers maintain that there is sufficient regional autonomy and that Flemish demands are exaggerated and separatist in nature. However, the diversity of Brussels and its significant economic and geopolitical importance in the Western hemisphere as the headquarters of the European Union and NATO, make it a unifying force, making partition unlikely at least for the near future. In response to heightening domestic and international speculation regarding the country's future, the Belgian government launched a public relations campaign through its embassies worldwide to assuage concerns and fight speculation that Belgium's division is impending, as indicated by numerous recent public opinion polls. The King of the Belgians rejected notions and speculation over a change in the nature of the Belgian state as part of proposals for the formation of a working government.

On 18 November 2007, an estimated 25,000 people marched in Brussels to support the unity of Belgium. The march was organized by Marie-Claire Houart whose petition calling for unity was signed by 140,000 Belgians.

The Belgian Chamber of Representatives on 22 November 2007, rejected the consideration of a proposed resolution to dissolve Belgium. The resolution had been introduced on 29 October by Bart Laeremans, Gerolf Annemans, Filip De Man and Linda Vissers (Vlaams Belang) and called upon the federal government to "take without delay the measures necessary for the purpose of preparing the break-up of the Belgian State, so the three communities—Flemings, Walloons and Germans—can go their own separate ways." Most Flemish parties voted against the consideration of the proposal. The three members of the New Flemish Alliance abstained, together with three members of CD&V.

In 2007, Polls in Editie NL, a Dutch news program on the commercial station RTL 4 and newspaper De Dag in the Netherlands showed that between 45% and 77% of Dutch nationals (the results of the two different polls) would support a merger of their country with Flanders. However a similar poll performed by Synovate Nederland in 2010, showed that only 20% of the Dutch support a union between the Netherlands and Flanders. A comparable poll held in 2007 in France showed that a majority of French citizens would support a merger of Wallonia with France, if Belgium ceased to exist. However, French politicians have ruled out any interference into the inner Belgian debate.

=== 2010 fall of government and new government formation ===
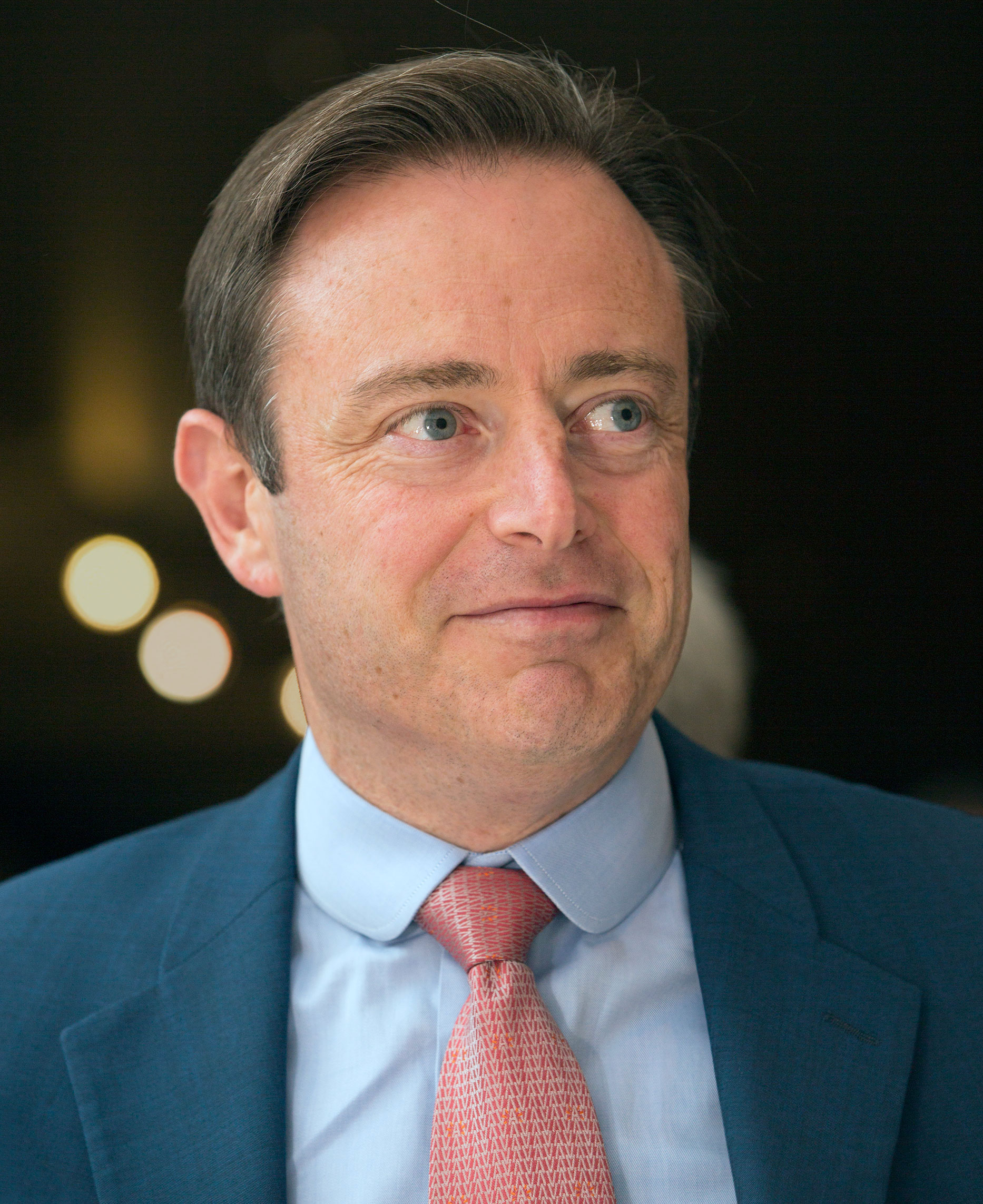
Bart De Wever (N-VA), the Flemish winner of 2010 Belgian federal elections, is separatist.

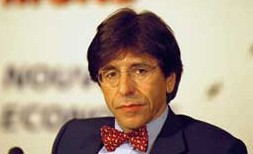
Elio Di Rupo (PS), the Walloon winner of 2010 Belgian federal elections, though opposed to a separation, proposed a Plan B to organize the partition of Belgium in case Plan A, the negotiations for forming a federal government, were to fail.

After the Open Flemish Liberals and Democrats (Open VLD) left the government on 22 April 2010, Prime Minister Yves Leterme offered his resignation to King Albert II. An election was then called for 13 June, amid fears that coalition-building would once again be protracted. In Flanders, the New Flemish Alliance (N-VA) party won a plurality with 27.8% of votes, while the winning party in Wallonia was the Socialist Party. Both parties, along with other parties, negotiated a state reform during the 2010 Belgian government formation.

Although seven parties (N-VA, CD&V, sp.a, Groen!, PS, cdH, and Ecolo) were participating, the negotiations were led by the main winners, Bart De Wever (N-VA) and Elio Di Rupo (PS). The large number of implied parties was due not only to the multipolar Belgian political landscape but also to the will of the Flemish parties to reform the state and, hence, to change the constitution, which can be modified according only to very restrictive rules including a two-thirds majority vote in the Lower House.

Some in the international media saw this election as evidence that Belgium would be partitioned. On 9 September 2010, a poll taken by RTL showed that a third of the French-speaking population supported the beginning of preparations for the country's partition. On 13 September, Het Laatste Nieuws published the result of a poll within the Flemish population. According to these results 60% of the Flemish did not desire an independent Flemish state and 26% were willing to support a partition. A similar poll taken on 25 September 2010, by La Libre Belgique showed that 40% of the Belgians were willing to return to a unitary Belgium (as the country was before the state reform of the 1970s). This percentage is to be compared with the 12% of the Belgians wanting a partition of the country and the 32% who desired a further federalization. The poll also showed that a unitary Belgian state was supported by 22% of the Flemish, 50% of the Brusselers and 51% of the Walloons, and that 16% of the Flemish wished a split of Belgium. It is interesting to compare this with the 40.8% of Flemings who voted for a party advocating Flemish independence during the 2010 election. In any case, the vast majority of the Belgians want a change: only 8% agree with the current Belgian federal system. The Belgians who participated in this poll were also asked which scenario they would prefer in the event that a partition of Belgium did occur. An independent Flanders together with a union of Brussels and Wallonia was supported by 35% of the Belgians. The creation of three small states (Flanders, Brussels and Wallonia) was preferred by 23%, a union between France and Wallonia was supported by 14%, and a union between Flanders and Brussels together with an independent Wallonia by 12%. In Flanders, 27% supported a three-state scenario and 26% supported a union between Flanders and Brussels. Those who had no preferred scenario numbered 25%. The majority of Walloons (53%) agreed with a union between Brussels and Wallonia while a minority (21%) supported a merge with France. Only 10% of the Walloons prefer an independent Walloon state. In contrast, the Brusselers were divided between a union with Wallonia (39%) and a city-state scenario (34%).

On 4 October 2010, De Wever (N-VA) left the negotiations. His exit put Di Rupo's Plan B for Belgium, i.e. a partition of Belgium along the borderline of the French Community, under a new light and many, particularly in the French-speaking part of the country, started to speak openly about its concrete implementation. Plan B is the continuation of Belgium with Brussels and Wallonia only and the departure of Flanders from the Belgian federation. On 10 October, Elio Di Rupo stated on television what his plan was: first, asking the Flemish population whether it was willing to secede; second, asking the population in Brussels and Wallonia whether they intended to remain united within Belgium. He also stressed that in either case citizens living in municipalities with linguistic facilities should also be asked. He however underlined that he did not desire such an extreme response but that this scenario should not be ignored. Di Rupo's declarations on television have been broadly discussed in the French-written press: according to Le Soir, the country had never been so close to a split than this day; less alarmist La Libre Belgique observed that the negotiations are deadlocked and considered Di Rupo's move a good way to define the point that the Francophones are not ready to negotiate further. However La Dernière Heure, L'Avenir and Flemish columnists in De Morgen, Het Laatste Nieuws, and De Standaard condensed Di Rupo's Plan B down to a tactical move in order to put the pressure on the negotiations and redefine the relations between PS and MR. The Plan B proposed by Di Rupo was developed by Christian Berhendt, a specialist of constitutional law at the University of Liège. According to Berhendt, a hypothetical partition of Belgium is constrained by the fact that no political party is ready to split Belgium at the cost of separating from the numerous international organizations to which Belgium is affiliated. These constraints are such that a splitting of the country would require the modification and ratification of a huge number of treaties. The interpenetration of the Belgian entities is so complicated that, in comparison, the peaceful splitting of Czechoslovakia appears quite simple. According to Berhendt several scenarios are therefore impossible: a unilateral secession of Flanders would be rejected by countries fearing secession of their own minorities, such as China, Russia or Spain, because this would create a precedent they cannot allow; the creation of an autonomous European district in Brussels is not a realistic perspective because the European Union, as it is now, is not able to administer such a large city; a scenario where Flanders and Brussels would form a union is unlikely either because, according to Berhendt, the French-speakers will never agree on such a treaty. For Marc Verdussen (Université Catholique de Louvain), two doorways are open: Plan B1, Belgium dissolves into two entities Flanders on the one hand and a new Wallonia-Brussels state on the other; and Plan B2, Flanders secedes and a residual Belgian state continues with Brussels and Wallonia. Though it is clear that Plan B2 is favorable to the Francophones, it is not evident that it would be accepted by the Flemings and by a hypothetical international tribunal. According to the Gewif (Groupe d'études pour la Wallonie intégrée à la France), Di Rupo's Plan B is not viable because the new Brussels-Wallonia would inherit an unbearable debt. The Gewif therefore argued that only a union with France would be possible. On 13 September, Le Soir published a five-page article on the possible consequences. According to this analysis, the largest burden on the shoulders of the new Brussels-Wallonian state would be unemployment (17% of the workers; to be compared to 8% in Flanders) and state debt (€150 billion, 106% of GDP). However Le Soir's columnists observed that the new state would have a huge GDP per capita (€31,000) and would rank 7th among the 27 EU states. Nevertheless, this would be only due to the inclusion of Brussels where the GDP per capita numbers more than €60,000.
