= Flahaut partition plan for Belgium =

Diplomatic proposal

Map of the Flahaut plan, proposed by France in 1830

The Flahaut partition plan for Belgium was a proposal developed in 1830 at the London Conference of 1830 by the French diplomat Charles de Flahaut, to partition Belgium. The proposal was immediately rejected by the French Foreign Ministry upon Charles Maurice de Talleyrand's insistence.

According to some sources, the French insistence on partitioning Belgium might have been invented by Talleyrand himself to show himself as a skilled statesman by maintaining Belgian independence.

== Background ==
Despite increasing popular demands for independence, major European powers were divided over the future of Belgium; stalling the negotiations at the London Conference of 1830. In early November 1830, the National Congress of Belgium voted to adopt a monarchy. Prince Louis, Duke of Nemours, the son of Louis Philippe I of France emerged as a popular candidate for the throne, however Louis Philippe rejected the candidacy after being urged to do so by Charles Maurice de Talleyrand. While placing the duke on the Belgian throne would have benefited France, Talleyrand argued that such a decision would offend the British and displace the balance of power in Europe.

== Plan ==
The Belgians outright refused to consider a candidate from the Dutch House of Nassau. In lieu of the stalemate, French diplomat Charles de Flahaut proposed partitioning Belgium. Belgium was to be split between the Netherlands, France and Prussia; with the largest part going to France. Britain on the other hand was to receive the city of Antwerp along with its port: Britain was seen as likely to accept receiving this seemingly small possession as Antwerp was the largest port located close to the British isles in the continent which made it an ideal staging point for any power planning an invasion of Britain (Calais on France was even closer but it was smaller in size, although the British had already in the past sought the demilitarization of Calais by the French).

== Aftermath ==
Talleyrand was briefly tempted by the prospect of partitioning Belgium, a proposal he had briefly toyed with before; however, he quickly changed his mind and rejected the Flahaut plan as absurd, exclaiming that "he would rather cut off his arm than sign the document". Talleyrand argued that providing Britain with a base on the continent after France fought numerous wars to prevent such an event was unacceptable. The creation of a direct border with the Kingdom of Prussia was likewise seen as problematic. Talleyrand ordered Flahaut to carry a letter outlining his objections to the proposal to the French Foreign Minister Sébastiani. Sébastiani heeded Talleyrand's warnings and did not pursue the implementation of the plan. It should be noted though, that it has been argued that Britain would have been likely to reject such a partition of Belgium mostly for the same reasons as having to defend a new land border of such a small size and so exposed sandwiched between two adversaries (France and Germany) would have been too expensive and problematic and it would have been much cheaper to just keep a powerful navy to prevent landings on the British isles.

The Belgian Congress set 28 January as the final date for the election of the new king. The popularity of Auguste, Duke of Leuchtenberg a Bonapartist candidate prompted Flahaut to resurrect his plan. Flahaut argued that in the case of the election of Leuchtenberg or any other candidate deemed unacceptable by France, partition would be the only available option. Talleyrand once again rebuffed Flahaut by repeating his previous arguments in a new letter to Sebastiani. On 3 February, the Belgians offered the crown to the Duke of Nemours. On 7 February, the powers issued an official statement refusing to recognize any election that would grant Leuchtenberg the throne. On 17 February, Louis Philippe formally renounced his dynasty's claim to the Belgian throne. Having secured the exclusion of the two leading candidates from the election process, Talleyrand continued to vigorously campaign behind the scenes for the election of Leopold of Saxe-Coburg. On 4 June, the Belgian Congress elected Leopold of Saxe-Coburg as the King of the Belgians with the support of the conference.

A minority on the Belgian political spectrum continue to support the partition of Belgium to this day, with the proportion of separatists in the country remaining stable throughout the years.
