= Greater Austria proposal =

19th century debate in Central Europe

The outlined Greater Austria (Germany and the whole of Austria, shown here in green) would have had around seventy million inhabitants

Between 1849 and 1851, Austria repeatedly proposed that all Habsburg-ruled territories should join a German confederation. Large areas of the Habsburg lands in east-central Europe (such as Hungary and northern Italy) were not part of the previous German state union, the German Confederation. The corresponding plans were given names such as Greater Austria, the Seventy Million Empire or, according to the proposers, the Schwarzenberg Plan or the Schwarzenberg-Bruck Plan.

An important initiative in this direction was the plan of the Austrian head of government Felix zu Schwarzenberg of March 9, 1849. The accession of Hungary and northern Italy would have considerably strengthened Austrian supremacy in Germany. The ideas of his trade minister Karl Ludwig von Bruck from October 1849 went in a similar direction: He sketched out the outlines of a corresponding customs union with world power ambitions.

The plans of 1849 and 1850 are to be understood partly as genuine offers and partly as propaganda in the German political debate of the time. Austria rejected the German Empire supported by the Frankfurt National Assembly because it was too liberal and because Austria was not allowed to join with all its territories. It also opposed the Prussian attempt in 1849/1850 to establish a more conservative federal state (Erfurt Union). This union would have united either most of the non-Austrian German states or at least many of them.

Neither Prussia nor Austria were able to push through their plans: The middle states such as Bavaria and Hanover were afraid of a federal state without Austria, in which Prussia would have been the dominant power, but equally afraid of a Greater Austria.

== Context ==
Under Metternich, the Austrian international policy had dual alignment, a partnership with Prussia through German Confederation and an understanding with Hungary internally. After the Hungarian revolution of 1848, the second arrangement was shattered. On the German side the tide initially turned to Austrian favor, from German: kleindeutsch to German: großdeutsch with Austria coming close to "undoubted predominance in Germany". Historians are undecided on whether Schwarzenberg's ideas of an empire from Adriatic Sea to the Baltic constituted real plans or were just a window dressing for continuation of the Metternich's policies. Regardless, the Crimean War exposed the weakness of Austria's position of non-alignment with either East or West. In this war, Austria took a stand against Russia, yet fared poorly with no support from the Confederation few years later during the Second Italian War of Independence. Under these circumstances, Austria badly needed support of Germany, so plans for subordination of the latter were not realistic anymore.

== See also ==
- German question
- United States of Greater Austria

== Literature ==
- Manfred Luchterhandt: Österreich-Ungarn und die preußische Unionspolitik 1848–1851. In: Gunther Mai (Publisher): Die Erfurter Union und das Erfurter Unionsparlament 1850. Böhlau, Cologne 2000, ISBN 3-412-02300-0, p. 81–110.
- Kralik, Richard (1914). "Das erste Großösterreich (1437-1457)". Österreichische geschichte (in German). Vienna: A. Holzhausen. pp. 67–70.
- Evans, R. J. W. (1994). "From Confederation to Compromise: The Austrian Experiment, 1849–1867" (PDF). Proceedings of the British Academy. 87. British Academy: 135–167.
