= Rattachism =

Secessionist political ideology in Wallonia, Belgium

Flag of France with rooster of Wallonia used by partisans of France-Wallonia union.

Rattachism (French: Rattachisme, IPA: [ʁataʃism], "re-attaching-ism") or, historically, Reunionism (Réunionisme, IPA: [ʁeynjɔnism], "reunion-ism") is a political ideology which calls for the French-speaking part of Belgium or Wallonia to secede from Belgium and become part of France. Brussels, which is majority French-speaking but enclaved in Flanders, may be included within this ideology; as may the six Flemish municipalities with language facilities for French-speakers around Brussels.

The Rattachist ideology is associated with a faction of the Walloon Movement and is advocated by the political parties Walloon Rally and Wallonia–France Rally. Neither presently have any parliamentary seats.

== History and etymology ==
The term "rattachism" derives from French rattacher 'reattach', indicating a reunification of what has been separated. This looks back to the former unity of the "French period" (1794–1815).

Present-day Belgium was conquered in 1795 by the French Republic during the French Revolutionary Wars. It was annexed to the Republic, which later became the Napoleonic Empire. After the Battle of Waterloo (1815), Wallonia became part of the Kingdom of the Netherlands under King William of Orange. Following the 1830 Belgian Revolution, Wallonia became a part of the Kingdom of Belgium.

Following the Belgian Revolution, a minority of Walloons called for unification with France. Four newspapers that supported unification were Le Journal de Verviers, Le Journal de la province de Liège, L'Industrie and L'Éclaireur. At this time Rattachists in Verviers were a majority. Rattachists argued that in order to preserve their economic prosperity they must unite with France, and that Wallonia as a region was culturally French. The Regent of Belgium, Érasme-Louis Surlet de Chokier, was a supporter in this period, as was Charles de Brouckère, Charles Rogier and Alexandre Gendebien. After the German Prince Leopold I became King of Belgium in 1831, the Rattachists' hopes of unification were dashed.

In 1968, President of France and World War II hero Charles de Gaulle stated that "If one day a political authority representative of Wallonia were to approach France officially, that day we would respond favourably, with full hearts, to a request that appeared legitimate".

== Current support ==
=== In France ===
A November 2007 poll published by French newspaper La Voix du Nord found about 54% of French respondents support unification with Wallonia. A 2008 poll found support at 60% among respondents.

A 2010 Institut français d'opinion publique (IFOP) poll found that if the Belgian political crisis led to the splitting up of Belgium, 66% of the French respondents would support the unification of Wallonia with France. IFOP has reported that support for unification with France has been rising since 2007.

Modern-day French politicians such as Marine Le Pen, Jean-Luc Mélenchon, Éric Zemmour, Jean-Pierre Chevènement, Nicolas Dupont-Aignan and Jacques Myard have all voiced support for Rattachism. Economist Jacques Attali also supports it. Past politicians have also supported it, the most important of which being former President Charles de Gaulle.

=== In Wallonia ===
Another IFOP poll taken in 2010 during the Belgian political crisis found that 32% of Walloons surveyed would support unification if Belgium splits up.

Walloon politicians who have at some point voiced support for the idea are Daniel Ducarme, Jean Gol, Claude Eerdekens and Robert Collignon.

== See also ==
- Greater Netherlands
- Pan-Netherlands
- Irredentism
- Natural borders of France
- Revanchism
- Hypothetical partition of Switzerland
