= Hypothetical partition of Switzerland =

Historical proposals to divide Switzerland

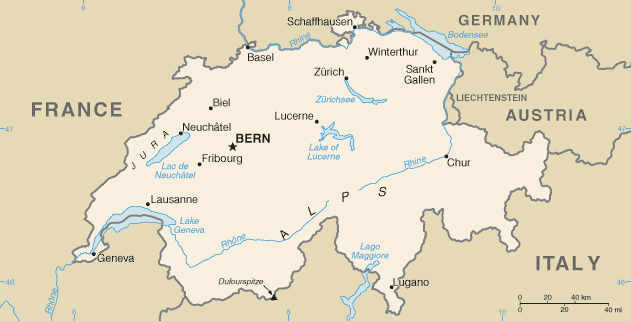
Map of Switzerland

The partition of Switzerland has been discussed in the modern era, envisioning a split of Switzerland along linguistic divisions, regarding German-speaking cantons, French-speaking Romandy and Swiss Italian cantons. This was a geopolitical question in the 19th century between Germany, France, and Italy, owing to its strategical situation. At the same time, the enlargement of Switzerland has likewise been discussed. In contrast to the hypothetical partition of Belgium, which is a current topic, the Swiss society is less concerned with linguistical differences and has a long-standing multicultural nation building and successful federalist and consensus democracy. The cantons enjoy a large degree of autonomy. The hypothetical partition of the country was suggested by other countries, and none of the Swiss parties advocate partition. The only case of recent internal conflict is the French-inhabited Jura that seceded from German-majority Bern in 1978, which was further enlarged in 2026.

== Background ==
=== Politics ===
The country is a democratic true federation and one of the most decentralized countries. It follows the consensus democracy model, with proportional participation integrating the minorities. While majoritarian democracies could encounter difficulties with multiculturalism, this is less the case in the consensus democracy, where the system demands compromise. The Swiss is a political nation, and was not constituted as on the principle of ethnicity, religion or language. The legislative policies differ considerably among cantons. Federalism was crucial in integrating the linguistical minorities, and without it, the state would not have had a successful nation building.

Swiss neutrality dates back to the 16th century.

=== Demographics ===
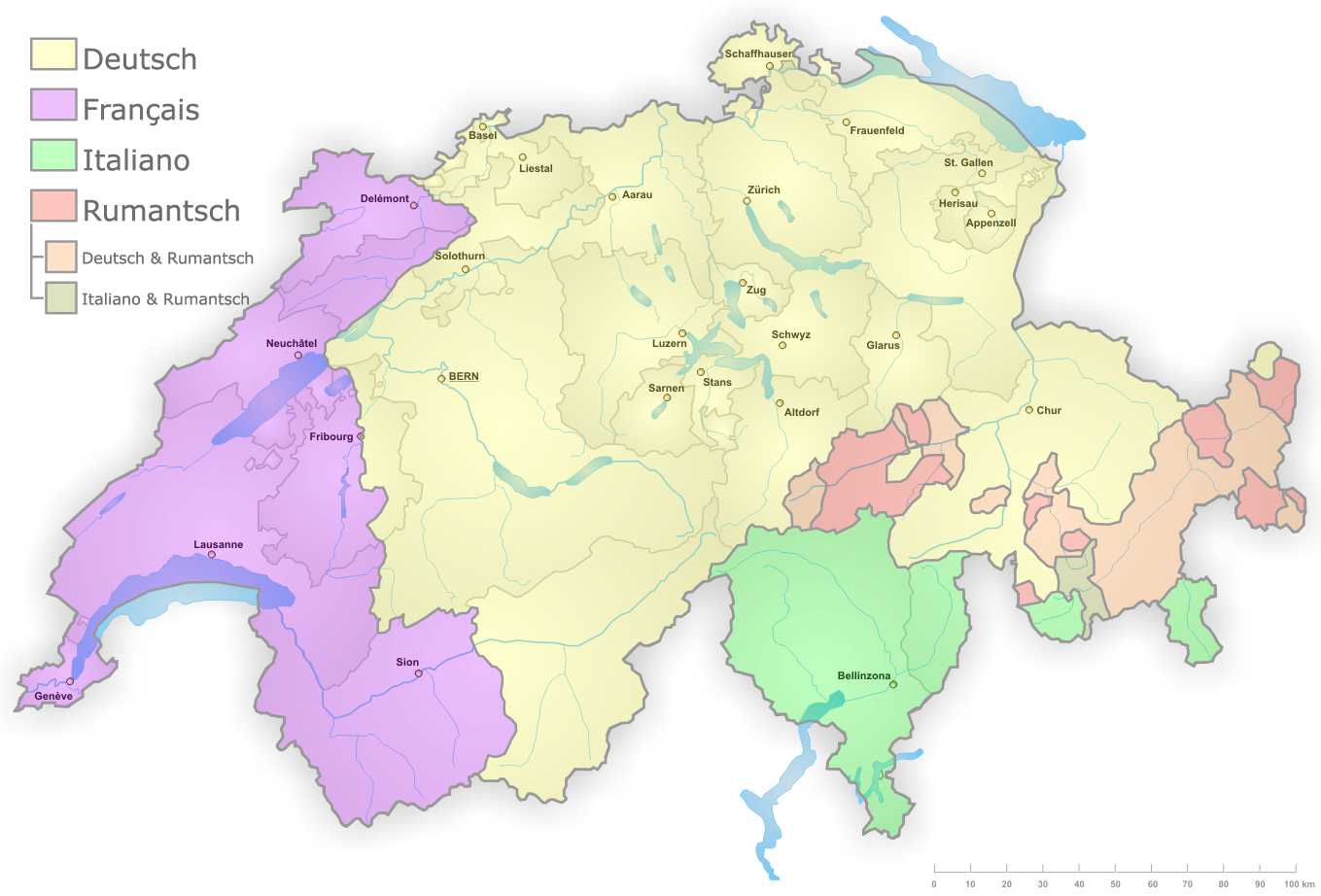
Languages of Switzerland

In 2020, 62.3% of the population of Switzerland were native speakers of German (either Swiss or Standard German) at home; 22.8% French (mostly Swiss French, but including some Franco-Provençal dialects); 8% Italian (mostly Swiss Italian, but including Lombard); and 0.5% Romansh. The German region (Deutschschweiz) is roughly in the east, north, and centre; the French part (la Romandie) in the west; and the Italian area (Svizzera italiana) in the south. There remains a small Romansh-speaking native population in Grisons in the east. The cantons of Fribourg, Bern, and Valais are officially bilingual; Grisons is officially trilingual.

The 19th-century nation building, unifying people of common ethnicity, culture or language, was not the case with Switzerland. The 1848 Constitution made four ethno-linguistic groups divided into 25 cantons of different history and culture. Most cantons are made up of an overwhelming majority of one group. There are 15 German, 6 French, one Italian, and four multilingual cantons.

Ethnic division never was a crucial issue, however, religious differences have broken out into conflicts. The Kulturkampf ("cultural struggle") led beyond religion into social issues.

Linguistical difference is regarded less of a concern in modern Swiss society, although it frequently leads to discussions, most importantly in regard to foreign affairs, which sees a strong division. There has been an economical gap in favour of the German cantons. The German community views the Röstigraben, the internal linguistical border with French, to be unimportant, while the French view it as primary, showing significant ethno-linguistic cleavage. There is a clear cultural association of the German community with Germany and the French community with France, however, as opposed to Belgium, where ethnic division is a major topic, this is not the case in Switzerland. There is rather limited ethnic mingling. The ethno-linguistic cleavage in Switzerland is one of the most important and visible cleavages in society.

== 19th century ==
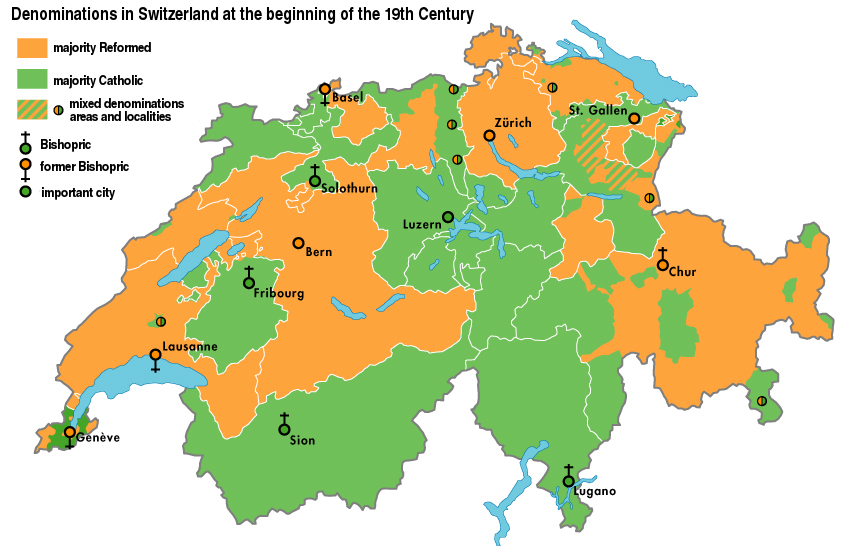
Religion map, 1800

Switzerland was noted as having a large influence on European affairs and being a political anomaly in the late 19th century. The geography was described as "erratic", a result of wars and politics. Its military importance could be seen in that via Switzerland, Germany could enter France, while France could cross the Jura into the Rhine, and Italy could be invaded and its defence towards France and Austria broken. The state limited both the German Empire and the French republic.

French general Guillaume Brune envisaged three successor republics of the Old Swiss Confederacy: the Rhodanic republic, Tellgovie and the Helvetic republic. Instead, with the French invasion of Switzerland, the French-speaking population of the Lower Valais declared a revolutionary Valais Republic on 16 March 1798 which was swiftly incorporated on 1 May into the Helvetic republic. There was internal strife and Valais was separated on 28 August 1802. In 1810, Valais was annexed by France as the department of "Simplon". In August 1815, the Valais entered the new Swiss Confederation as a canton.

The Congress of Vienna (1814–1815) in regards to Switzerland was a strategical step to ensure that the Alps did not fall into the hands of any power in case of war, thus Swiss neutrality was confirmed. In 1841, a German view on Swiss politics saw Austrian intention to partition Switzerland among France and Austria, and join the Catholic areas into the Austrian empire. In November 1847, the Sonderbund War broke out after seven Catholic cantons opposing centralization united in 1845; the Catholic union was defeated by the confederate forces and it resulted in Switzerland as a federal state.

Germany had sought to protect Switzerland by treaty while France likewise sought Swiss occupation of Chablais and Faucigny districts of Upper Savoy (part of the Kingdom of Sardinia) as per the 1815 and 1830 treaties, as to block Italian undermining of France. Germany in turn held that a Swiss occupation of Savoy was settled at the Congress of Vienna, and was not in the discussion; furthermore, the French annexation of Savoy (1858) denied this right. Due to this, Germany made a serious proposal to Italy regarding a partition between the two, which Italy declined, preferring a friendly and neutral Switzerland instead of having a powerful neighbour. Germany then made a proposal to France, which also declined, as Switzerland was ethnically "Teutonic" (Germanic), and per ethno-linguistic principle, France and Italy could only claim small pieces.

When Bismarck contemplated taking back its support to Swiss neutrality in 1889, German newspapers reported that there was an idea for the partition of Switzerland among Germany, France, Austria and Italy "as the simplest solution to the great European problem".

== World War I ==
Switzerland maintained official neutrality during the war. However, with two of the Central Powers (Germany and Austria-Hungary) and two of the Entente Powers (France and Italy) all sharing borders and populations with Switzerland, neutrality proved difficult. While the German-speaking majority in Switzerland generally favored the Central Powers, the French- and, later, Italian-speaking populations sided with the Entente Powers, which would cause internal conflict in 1918. Switzerland almost broke apart with this divide. However, the country managed to keep out of the war, although it was blockaded by the Allies and therefore suffered some difficulties.

== World War II ==
Before the war, Nazi Germany made repeated assurances that it would respect Swiss neutrality. This was however a political maneuver, as Germany planned to end Swiss sovereignty following victories over other European countries. In June 1941, Adolf Hitler said "Switzerland possesses the most disgusting and miserable people and political system. The Swiss are the mortal enemies of the new Germany". The Nazi pan-German political aims called for the unification of all Germans into a Greater Germanic Reich, which included the Swiss people. German Foreign Minister Joachim von Ribbentrop directly alluded to the possibility of dividing Switzerland between Germany and Fascist Italy. In official German irredentist maps, Switzerland was shown as simply a gau of Germany.

Although the Nazi Operation Tannenbaum was planned, an invasion never came. Switzerland readied for defence with the National Redoubt plan that dated back to the 1880s, and mobilized upon outbreak of war. Switzerland was a base for espionage by both sides in the conflict and often mediated communications between the Axis and Allied powers by serving as a protecting power. Switzerland's trade was blockaded by both the Allies and by the Axis, with both sides exerting pressure on Switzerland not to trade with the other.

== Internal separatism ==
From 1815 to 1979, the French-speaking and Catholic Bernese Jura (part of German-majority and Protestant Canton of Bern) included the territory now forming the separate canton of Jura, which seceded following a national popular vote on 24 September 1978. Three French districts remained part of Bern.

== Gaddafi's proposal ==
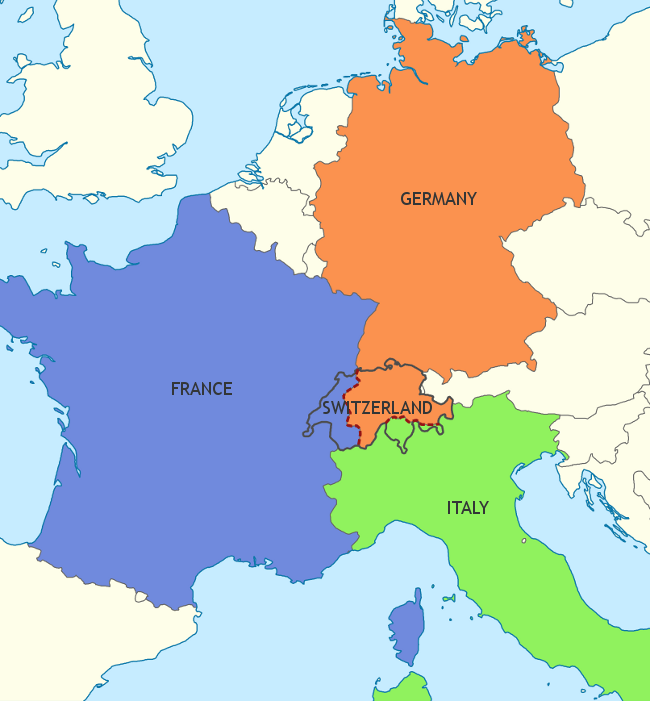
Gaddafi's proposal presented at the UN (2009)

Libyan dictator Muammar Gaddafi came into diplomatic conflict with Switzerland in 2008–2011 due to the arrest of his son Hannibal. He called Switzerland a "World mafia" and said that he would use an atomic bomb on Switzerland, if he had one. On 15 September 2009 he proposed at the United Nations that Switzerland be abolished and divided between Germany, Italy and France.

== See also ==
- Spiritual national defence
- Alemannic separatism
- Hypothetical partition of Belgium
- Pan-Germanism
- Italian irredentism
  - Italian irredentism in Switzerland
- Natural borders of France

== Sources ==
- Jahn, Egbert (2019). "Switzerland". War and Compromise Between Nations and States: Political Issues Under Debate – Vol. 4. Springer Nature. ISBN 978-3-030-34131-2.
- Jenkins, John Robert Graham (1986). Jura Separatism in Switzerland. Clarendon Press. ISBN 978-0-19-823247-6.
- Leitz, Christian (2000). Nazi Germany and Neutral Europe during the Second World War. Manchester University Press. pp. 14-. ISBN 978-0-7190-5069-5. OL 18304875M.
- McCrackan, William Denison (1892). The Rise of the Swiss Republic. Arena publishing Company. pp. 357-.
- Winchester, Boyd (1891). The Swiss Republic. J.B. Lippincott.
- Linder, Wolf; Steffen, Isabelle (2006), Ethnic Structure, Inequality and Governance in the Public Sector in Switzerland (PDF), Democracy, Governance and Human Rights Programme Paper Number 22, UNRISD
- De Peyster, John Watts (1863). Secession in Switzerland and in the United States Compared.
- Schmid, Carol L. (2024-03-29). Conflict and Consensus in Switzerland. Univ of California Press. ISBN 978-0-520-31200-5.
