= Maddens Doctrine =

Strategy in Flemish nationalist Belgian politics

The Maddens Doctrine or Strategy refers, in Belgian politics, to a strategy suggested by Bart Maddens to achieve progress in the state reform.

The strategy has been adopted by, among others, the New Flemish Alliance and the Flemish People's Movement, but also has opponents, including within the Aktiekomitee Flemish Social Security, who doubts its effectiveness.

The aim of this strategy is to enforce a positive evolution of the state reform from the Flemish nationalist point of view. Its main idea is that the reform may only achieve progress if both parties, the Flemish and the Francophones look for it. According to Maddens, if the Flemish want a reform, they have to operate in such a way that the Francophones require further devolution from the federal government to the federated entities.

Three options are open in order to reach this objective:

- create social and political organisations within Flanders which are autonomous of federal structures;
- reduce the budget of the federal government;
- associate any further devolution of powers from the federal government to the Communities and Regions with new financial support to the federal government.

== Bibliography ==
- Anja Otte (2009-10-27). "The doctrine". Flanders Today. Archived from the original on 2011-08-23.
- Bart Haeck (2009-06-30). "I'll never be your beast of burden". De Tijd.
