= Pajottenland =

Distinct region of Belgium

Coordinates: 50°47′N 4°7′E

The Pajottenland (Dutch pronunciation: [paːˈjɔtə(n)ˌlɑnt]; in English occasionally Payottenland) is a distinct region within the Flemish Brabant province and the south-western part of the Brussels-Capital Region of Belgium. The Pajottenland is predominantly farmland, with occasional gently rolling hills, and lies mostly between the rivers Dender and Zenne/Senne. The area has historically provided food and drink for the citizens of Brussels, especially Lambic beers, which are only produced there and in the Zenne valley where Brussels is.

== Geography ==
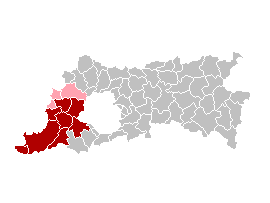
Townships of the Pajottenland, (Flemish Brabant, Flanders, Belgium): Red. Pink: depending on the sources may or may not belong to the Pajottenland.

The Pajottenland is generally understood to cover the following municipalities and submunicipalities:

- Affligem: Essene, Hekelgem and Teralfene
- Asse: Asse, Bekkerzeel, Kobbegem, Mollem, Relegem and Zellik
- Bever
- Dilbeek: Dilbeek, Itterbeek (with Sint-Anna-Pede), Schepdaal (with Sint-Gertrudis-Pede), Sint-Martens-Bodegem, Sint-Ulriks-Kapelle, Groot-Bijgaarden
- Galmaarden: Galmaarden, Tollembeek, Vollezele
- Gooik: Gooik (with Strijland), Kester, Leerbeek, Oetingen
- Herne: Herne (with Kokejane), Herfelingen, Sint-Pieters-Kapelle
- Lennik: Gaasbeek, Sint-Kwintens-Lennik (with Eizeringen), Sint-Martens-Lennik
- Liedekerke
- Pepingen: Pepingen, Beert, Bellingen, Bogaarden, Elingen, Heikruis
- Roosdaal: Pamel (with Ledeberg), Borchtlombeek, Onze-Lieve-Vrouw-Lombeek, Strijtem, Kattem
- Sint-Pieters-Leeuw: Sint-Pieters-Leeuw, Oudenaken, Ruisbroek, Sint-Laureins-Berchem, Vlezenbeek
- Ternat: Ternat, Sint-Katherina-Lombeek, Wambeek

According to a lawyer named De Gronckel who first described it, the Pajottenland also includes Liedekerke and the Ninove deelgemeenten Neigem and Lieferinge. The rural part of Anderlecht, particularly in earlier times before it became a municipality of the Brussels Region, may also be included.

The tourist area marketed under the name Pajottenland en Zennevallei (Pajottenland and Zenne valley) also includes the municipalities Beersel, Drogenbos, Halle, Linkebeek, Sint-Genesius-Rode, which are clustered around the Zenne valley to the south-west of the main Pajottenland region.

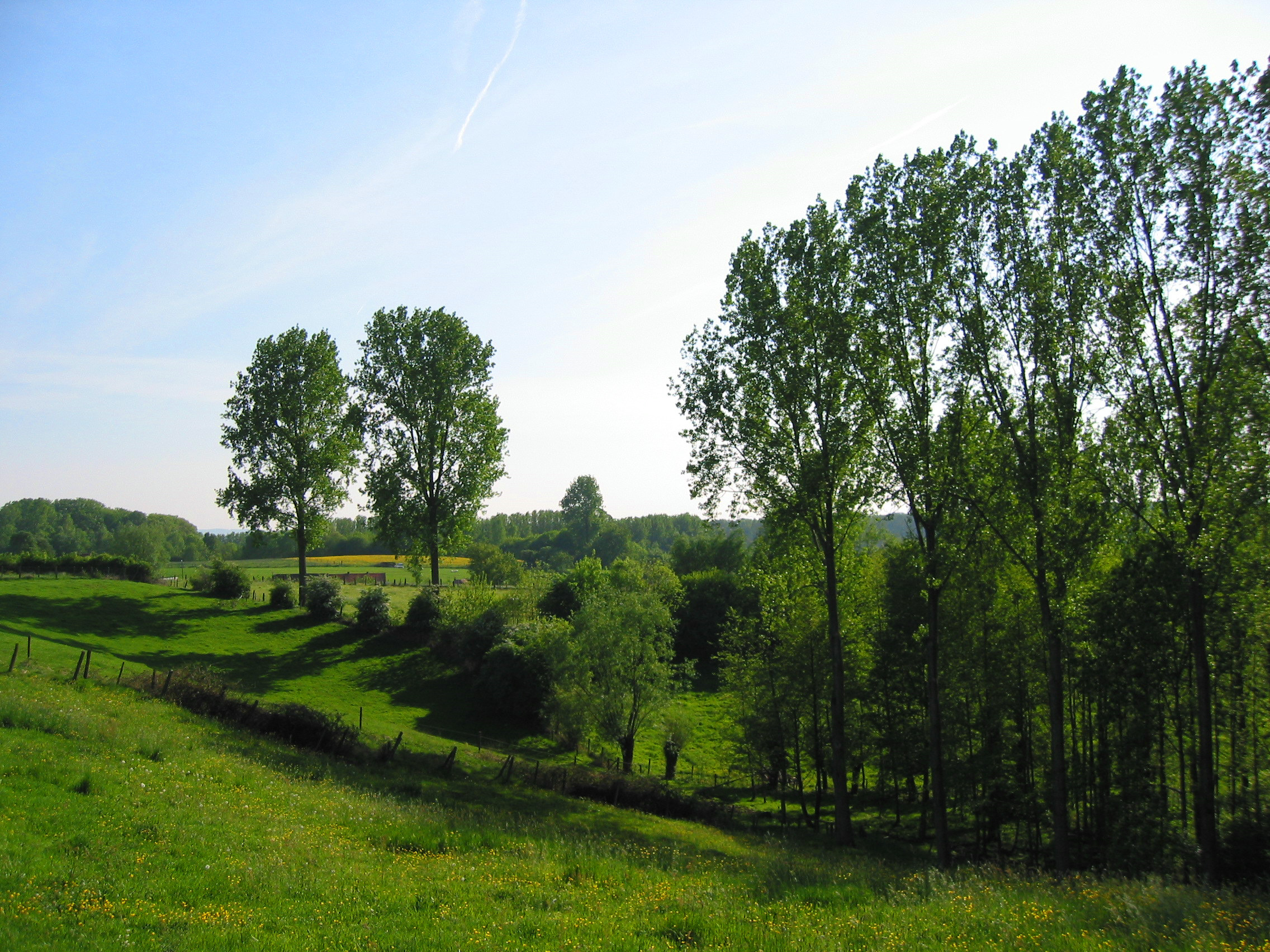
Landscape in Gooik

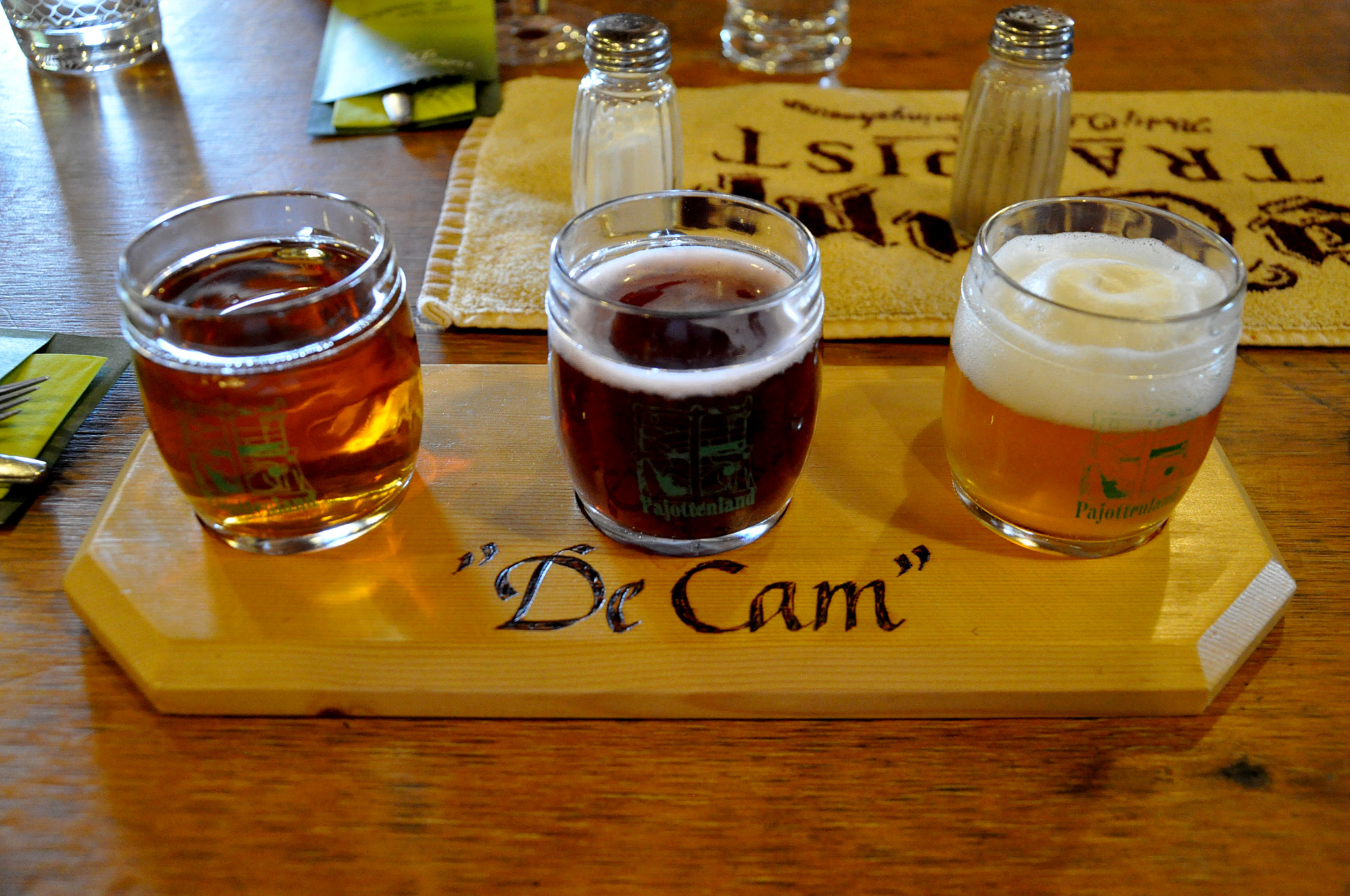
Lambic, Kriek and Gueuze De Cam, Gooik

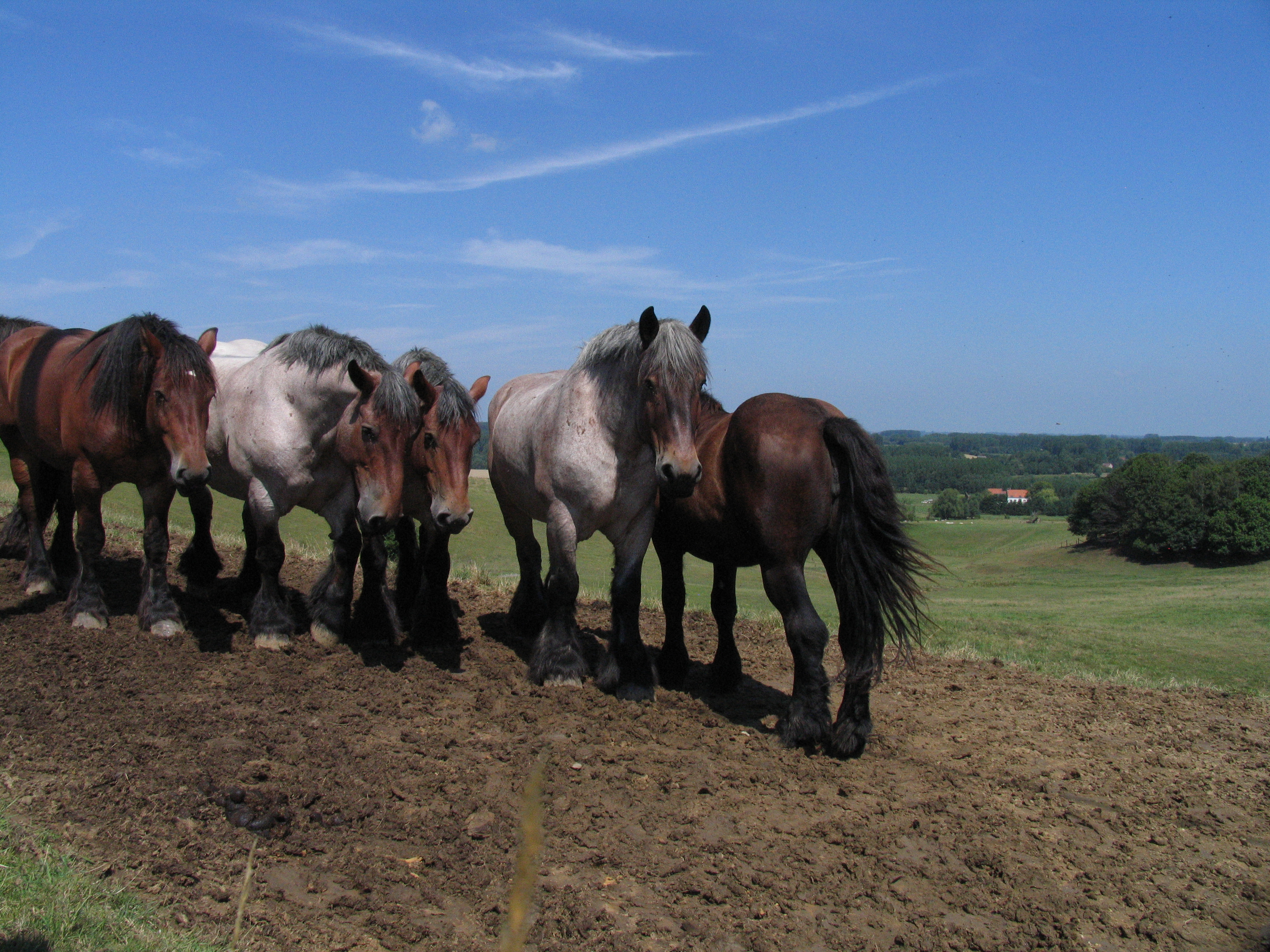
Brabant draft horses

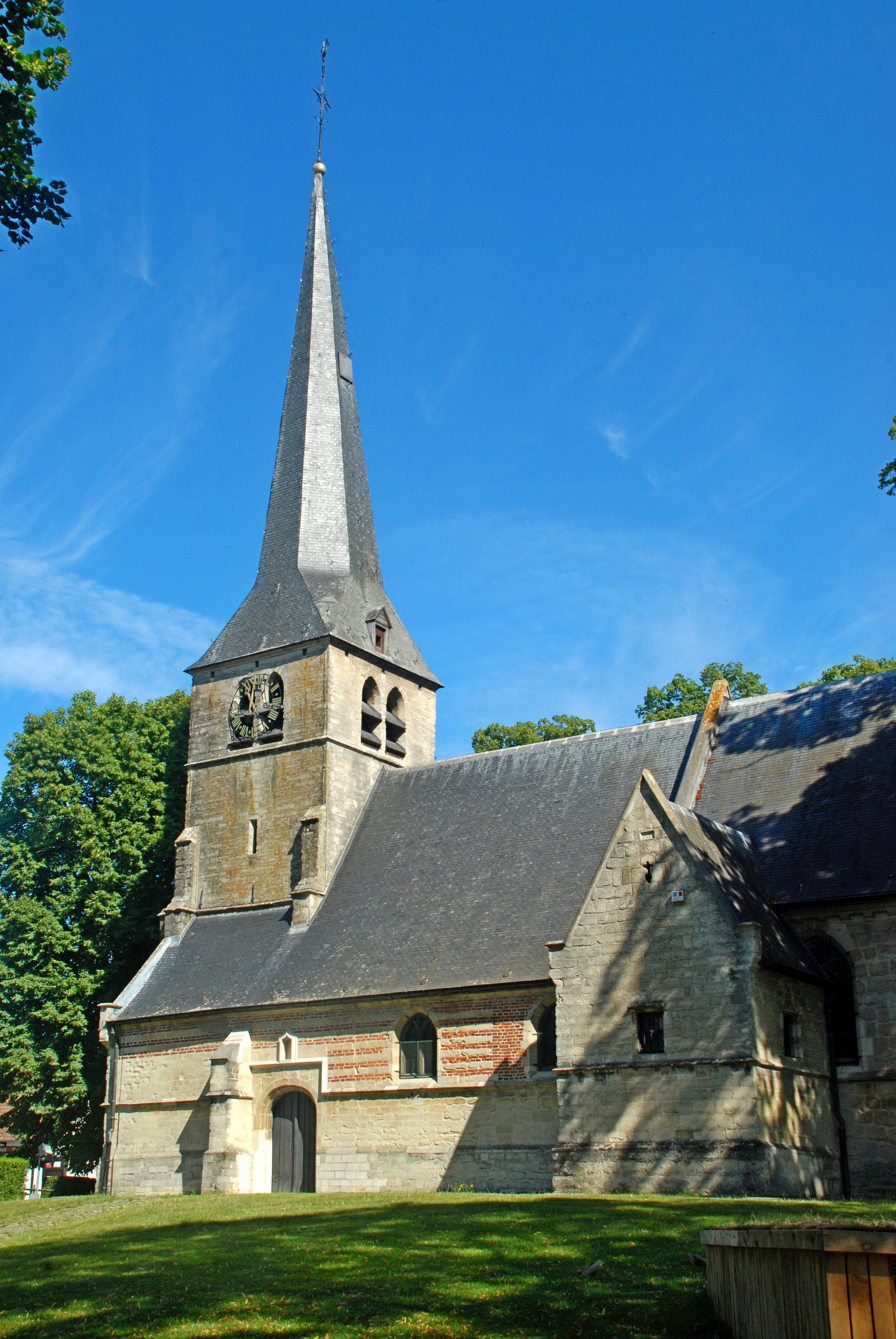
Little church in Sint-Anna-Pede (Dilbeek)

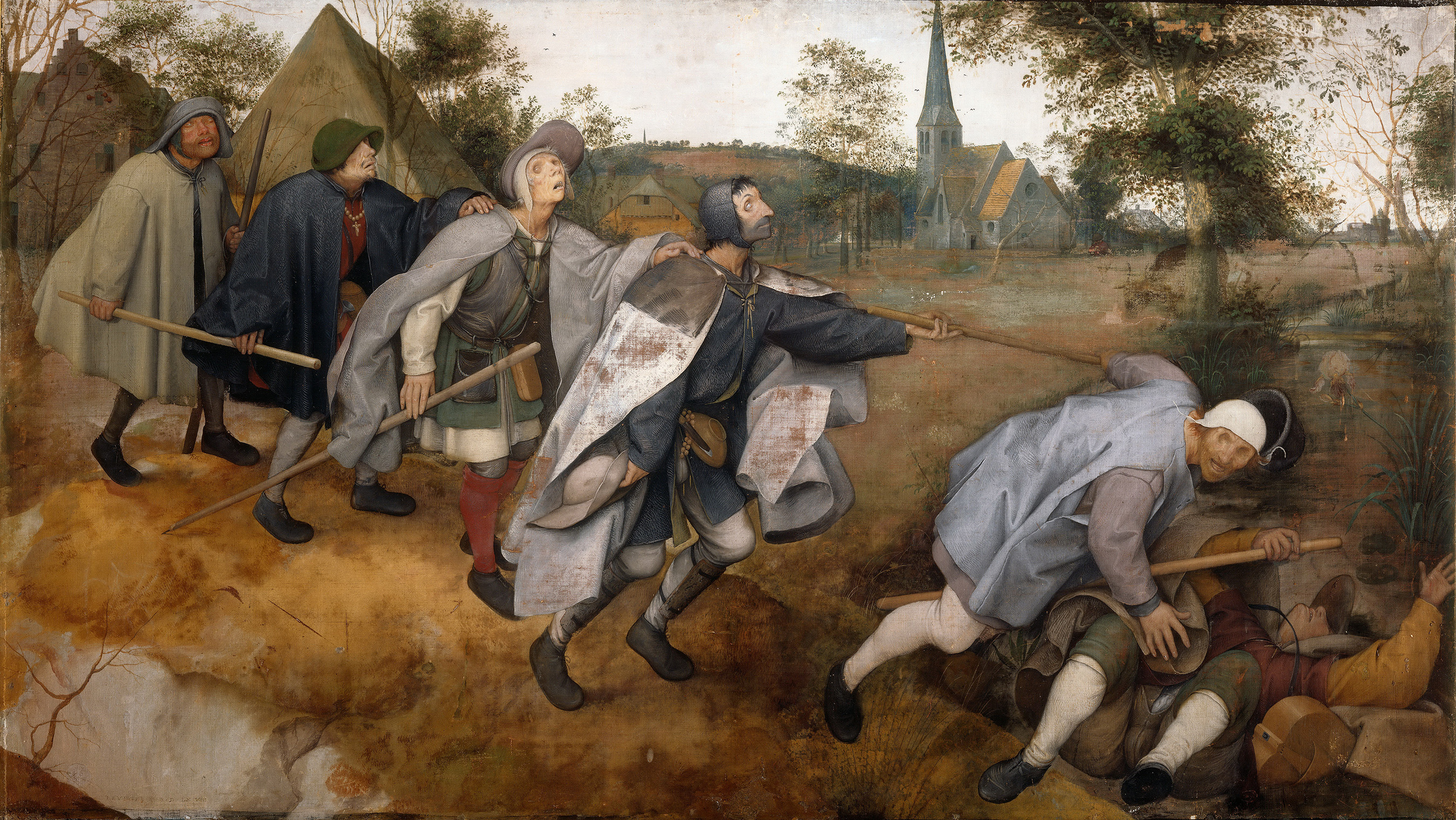
The Blind Leading the Blind, Pieter Bruegel the Elder, 1568

== See also ==
- Communities, regions and provinces of Belgium
