= List of massacres in Belgium =

This is a list of massacres which have occurred in the territory now covered by the modern country of Belgium.

== Massacres before 1914 ==
Name	Date	Location	Deaths	Notes
Genocide against the Eburones	53 BC	Belgium	Unknown	Annihilation of the Eburones tribe by Roman forces led by Julius Caesar. According to the Gallic Wars, "He wanted...to annihilate the race of the Eburones and even the name itself."
Matins of Bruges	18 May 1302	Bruges, West Flanders	2,000	Massacre of the French garrison of Bruges by Flemish militia during the Franco-Flemish War
Brussels massacre	22 May 1370	City of Brussels, Brussels Capital Region	6	Massacre of the Jewish community in Brussels
Spanish Fury at Mechelen	2 Oct 1572	Mechelen, Province of Antwerp	Unknown	Sack and massacre of citizens in the city of Mechelen by Spanish soldiers after the fall of the city during the Eighty Years' War.
Sack of Antwerp	4 Nov 1576	Antwerp, Province of Antwerp	7,000	Massacre of citizens and militia of Antwerp by renegade Spanish soldiers after the fall of the city during the Eighty Years' War.
Belgian general strike of 1893	17 Apr 1893	Mons, Province of Hainaut	7	Garde Civique fired on strikers protesting for universal suffrage during the general strike of 1893.

== Massacres during World War I and II ==
Name	Date	Location	Deaths	Notes
Aarschot massacre	19 August 1914	Aarschot, Flemish Brabant,	156	Massacre of Belgian civilians by invading German troops in collective punishment during the First World War
Andenne massacre	August 1914	Andenne, Province of Namur	211	Massacre of Belgian civilians by German troops in collective punishment during the First World War
Massacre of Tamines	21 Aug 1914	Tamines, Province of Namur	384	Massacre of Belgian civilians by German soldiers in response for "Franc-tireur" attacks during the First World War
Dinant massacre	23 Aug 1914	Dinant, Province of Namur	674	Massacre of Belgian civilians by German soldiers in response for "Franc-tireur" attacks during the First World War
Sack of Louvain	25 Aug 1914	Leuven, Flemish Brabant	248	Massacre of Belgian civilians by rampaging German soldiers (the "Rape of Belgium") during the First World War
Vinkt Massacre	25 May 1940	Vinkt, East Flanders	86-140	Massacre of Belgian civilians during the German invasion of Belgium.
Courcelles Massacre	18 Aug 1944	Courcelles, Province of Hainaut	20	Massacre of Belgian civilians by Rexist collaborators in retaliation for the murder of a politician by the resistance.
Malmedy massacres	December 1944	Malmedy and surrounding region	473 (83 in main incident)	Massacre of POWs and civilians by SS troops led by Joachim Peiper in a dozen incidents during the Battle of the Bulge
Baugnez crossroads massacre	17 Dec 1944	Baugnez (near Malmedy), Province of Liège	81	Massacre of captured US soldiers by SS troops during the Battle of the Bulge
Wereth massacre	17 Dec 1944	Wereth, Province of Liège	11	Torture and murder of African-American POWs by German troops during the Battle of the Bulge
Bande Massacre	24 Dec 1944	Bande, Province of Luxembourg	34	Murder of 34 men between 20–31 years old by German soldiers during the Battle of the Bulge.
Chenogne massacre	1 Jan 1945	Chenogne, Province of Luxembourg	80	Massacre of German POWs by American soldiers in retaliation for the Malmedy massacre during the Battle of the Bulge.

== Post-war period ==
Name	Date	Location	Deaths	Notes
Grâce-Berleur shooting	30 Jul 1950	Grâce-Berleur, Province of Liège	4	Massacre when Gendarmerie fired on demonstrators during the Royal Question.
Bogaarden shooting	12 May 1987	Bogaarden	8 (including the perpetrator)	
Dendermonde nursery attack	23 Jan 2009	Sint-Gillis-bij-Dendermonde, East Flanders	3	Attack on a nursery by an individual. 12 people were also injured in the attack.
Liège attack	13 Dec 2011	Liège, Province of Liège	6	Gun and grenade attack on civilians by an individual. 125 people were also injured.
Brussels bombings	22 Mar 2016	Zaventem, Province of Flemish Brabant and City of Brussels, Brussels-Capital Region	32 (+3 suicide bombers)	Three coordinated nail bombings by five suicide bombers: two at Brussels Airport, and one at Maalbeek metro station. Responsibility claimed by Islamic State of Iraq and the Levant (ISIL). 340 people were also injured in the attacks.
2023 Brussels shooting	16 Oct 2023	Brussels-Capital Region	3 (including the perpetrator)	An Islamist Terrorist attack where the perpetrator opened fire on Swedish football supporters on their way to a football match.
