= Jan van Casembroot =

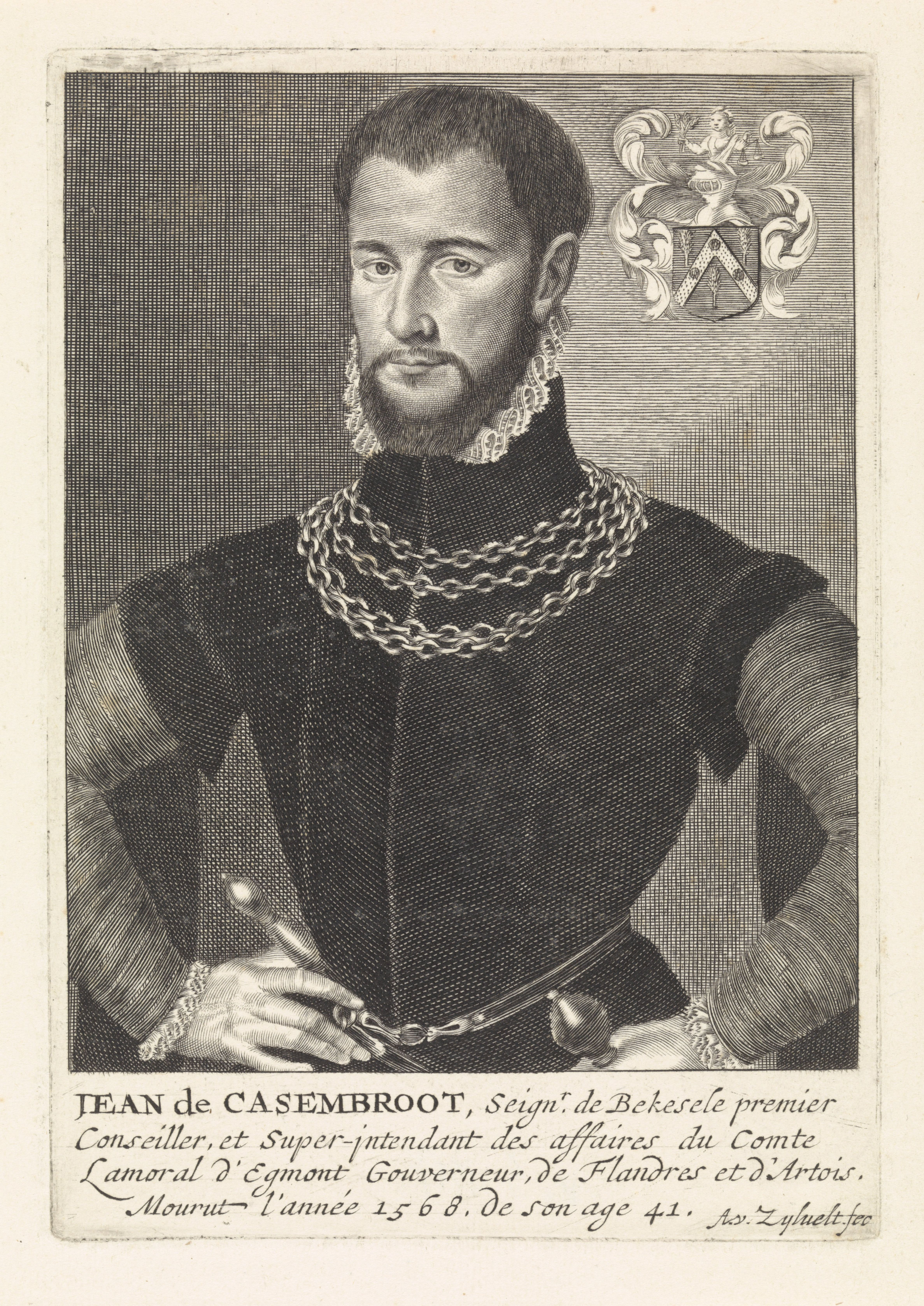
Portrait of Jan van Casembroot by Anthony van Zijlvelt,

Jan van Casembroot, Lord of Backerzele (also Jehan de Casembroot) (ca. 1525 – 14 September 1568) was a Flemish noble and poet. He was lord of Bekkerzeel, Zellik, Kobbegem, Berchem-Oudenaarde and Fenain.

== Life ==
Jan Casembroot was born in Bruges, where he descended from an important family, originally from Piemonte. His father Lenaert Casembroot (1495–1558) was mayor of Bruges and his mother was Maria Reyvaert. He married Wilhelmina van Brockhorst, and had with her a daughter named Anna. He was secretary of Lamoral, Count of Egmont and he signed the Compromise of Nobles, in which the nobles pleaded for religious freedom.

Jan Casembroot was a Catholic, but became a fierce opponent of Cardinal Antoine Perrenot de Granvelle. He also opposed the Beeldenstorm. Jan Casembroot was named governor of Oudenaarde by the count of Egmont, and managed to restore order in the city. In the agreement that he signed with the calvinists, he went further than the regents had stipulated in the Accord of 25 August 1566. He was arrested together with the count of Egmont on 9 September 1567, tortured and condemned to death on 9 August 1568 by the Council of Troubles led by the Fernando Alvarez de Toledo Duke of Alva, and beheaded together with Anthony van Stralen, Lord of Merksem on 14 September 1568 at Vilvoorde.

== Publications ==
Several of his Latin poems were published, which reportedly display a humanistic sensibility.

- Oratio in quodlibeticis, 1559.
- Carmen in laudem Marci Laurini et Huberti Goltzii.

== Literature and references ==
- A. J. VAN DER AA, Jan de Casembroot, in: Biographisch woordenboek der Nederlanden, T. 3, 1858.
- Théodore JUSTE, Jean Casembroot, in: Biographie nationale de Belgique, T. III, Brussels, 1872.
- P. J. BLOK & P. C. MOLHUYSEN, Jehan Casembroot, in: Nieuw Nederlandsch biografisch woordenboek, T. 7, 1927.
- Eug. DE SEYN, Geschied- en aardrijkskundig woordenboek der Belgische gemeenten, Brussels, 1938.
- Hendrik DEMAREST, Jean Casembroot, in: Lexicon van West-Vlaamse schrijvers, T. 4, Torhout, 1987.
- Charles-Albert DE BEHAULT, Le Compromis des nobles et le Conseil des troubles, Bulletin of the Association Nobility of the Belgian Kingdom, april 2023, nr 314, P. 11-56
