= Chenogne (disambiguation) =

Chenogne is a village in Belgium.

Chenogne may also refer to:

- Chenogne massacre, that took place at Chenogne, Belgium in 1945

== See also ==
- Iness Chepkesis Chenonge (born 1982)
