= Louis de Dieu =

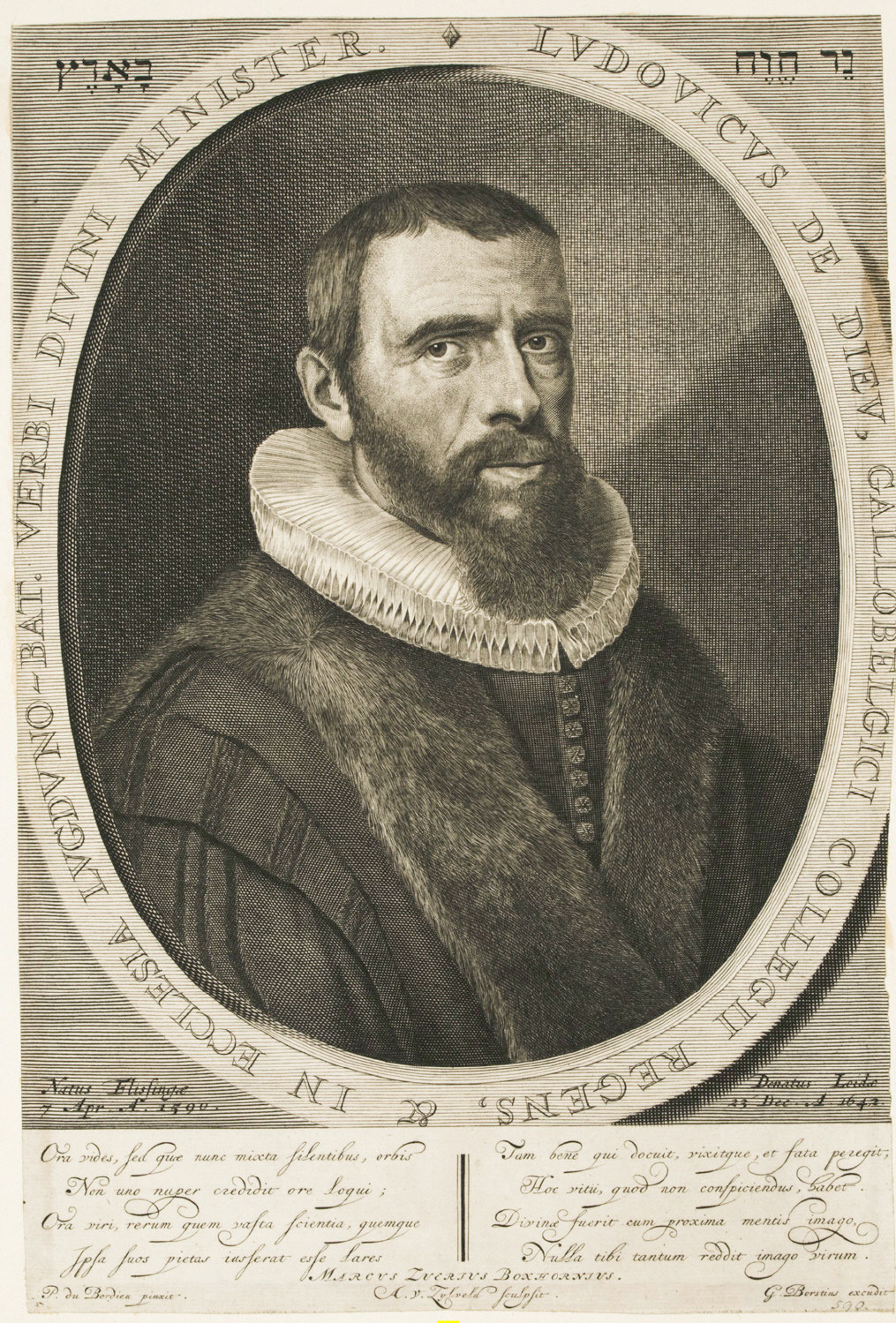
Ludovicus de Dieu, by Anthony van Zijlvelt after a portrait by Pieter Dubordieu

Louis de Dieu (7 April 1590, Flushing – 23 December 1642, Leiden) was a Dutch Protestant minister and a leading orientalist.

His grandfather had served at the court of Charles V, and his father, Daniel de Dieu, was also a protestant minister and linguist. Louis was educated at Leiden, where he was regent of the Walloon College (1637-42). He declined the chair of theology and oriental languages at Utrecht.

== Works ==
- Compendium Grammaticae Hebraicae et dictionnariolum praecipuarum radicum (Leiden, 1626)
- Apocalypsis S. Joannis syriace, ex manuscripto exemplari bibliothecae Josephi Scaligeri deprompta, edita caractere syriaco et hebraeo, cum versione latina, graeco textu et notis (Leiden, 1627)
- Grammatica trilinguis, Hebraica, Syriaca, et Chaldaica (Leiden, 1628)
- Rudimenta linguae persicae (Leiden, 1639); a Persian grammar
- Grammatica Linguarum Orientalium, ex recensione Dav. Clodii (Frankfurt, 1683); four grammars—hebraic, syriac, chaldaic and persian.
- Critica sacra, sive animadversiones in loca quaedam difficiliora Veteris et Novi Testam (Amsterdam, 1693); commentary on the Old Testament and the New Testament
- Aphorismi theologici (Utrecht, 1693)
- Traite contre l'Avarice (Deventer, 1695)

== Bibliography ==
- Nicolas, Michel (1855), "Louis de Dieu", Nouvelle Biographie générale (in French), vol. 14, Paris: Imprimeurs-libraires de l'institute de France, p. 158
- Henk J. de Jonge (1975). "The Study of the New Testament in the Dutch universities 1575-1700 in Th. H. Lunsingh Scheurleer and G.H.M. Posthumus Meyjes (eds)". Leiden University in the Seventeenth Century. Leiden: 113–29.
