= Van Wijnendaele =

Van Wijnendaele is a Belgian toponymic surname, named for Wijnendale. Notable people with the surname include:

- Karel Van Wijnendaele (1882–1961), Belgian journalist and politician
- Michel Van Wijnendaele (c. 1959–1987), Belgian mass murderer
