= Bollebeek =

Coordinates: 50.920313°N 4.24186°E

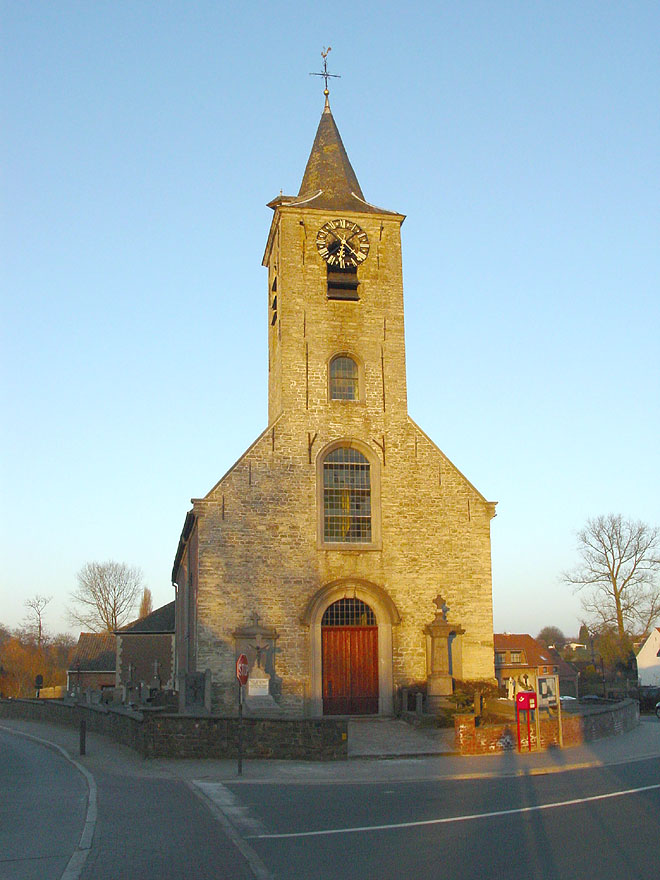
Bollebeek church

Bollebeek is a hamlet in the municipality of Asse, Flemish Brabant, Belgium. It was part of the village of Mollem.

It has a 13th-century church tower.
