= Yannick Mertens =

Belgian tennis player

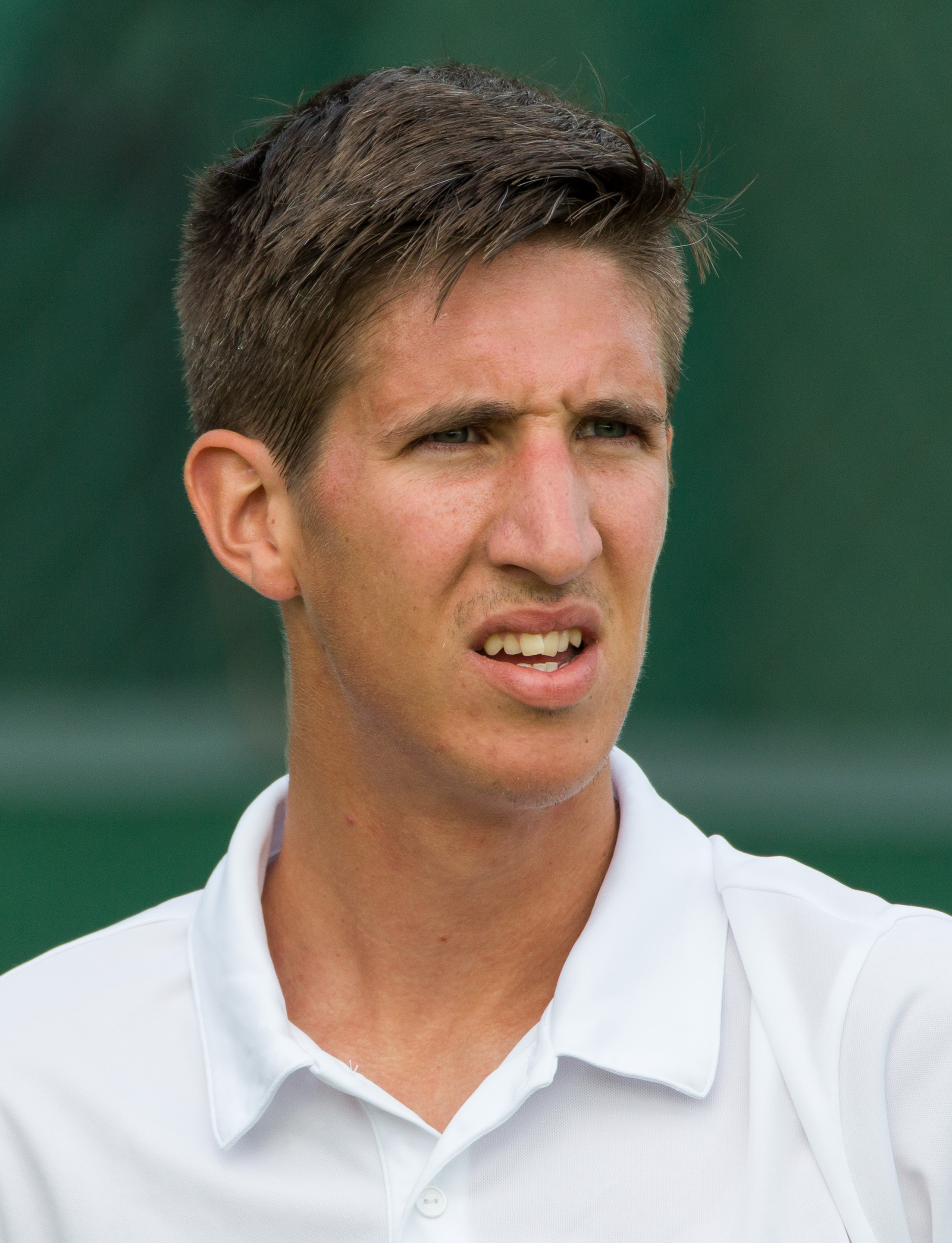
- Country (sports): Belgium
- Residence: Ternat, Belgium
- Born: 25 June 1987 (age 38); Anderlecht, Belgium
- Height: 1.89 m (6 ft 2 1/2 in)
- Turned pro: 2006
- Retired: 2023 (last match played)
- Plays: Right-handed (two-handed backhand)
- Prize money: US$510,635

Singles
- Career record: 1–2
- Career titles: 0
- Highest ranking: No. 179 (17 August 2015)

Grand Slam singles results
- Australian Open: Q3 (2012)
- French Open: Q2 (2012, 2016)
- Wimbledon: Q3 (2015, 2016)
- US Open: Q3 (2012)

Doubles
- Career record: 0–0
- Career titles: 0
- Highest ranking: No. 316 (1 October 2018)
- Last updated on: 31 January 2025.

Yannick Mertens (born 25 June 1987) is a professional former tennis player from Belgium who mainly has played on the ATP Challenger Tour. On 27 July 2015, he reached his highest ATP singles ranking of world No. 179, and his highest doubles ranking of No. 363 was reached on 19 September 2011.

== Personal life ==
He was born in Anderlecht and currently resides in Ternat.

His favorite surface is clay, and he is coached by his father Kris Mertens.

== Future and Challenger finals ==
=== Singles: 53 (28–25) ===
Legend
ATP Challengers 0 (0–0)
ITF Futures 53 (28–25)

Titles by surface
Hard (19–18)
Clay (8–7)
Grass (0–0)
Carpet (1–0)

Result	W–L	Date	Tournament	Tier	Surface	Opponent	Score
Loss	0–1	Apr 2008	Antalya, Turkey F4	Futures	Clay	(Romania) Gabriel Moraru	6–4, 3–6, 4–6
Loss	0–2	May 2008	Ruse, Bulgaria F2	Futures	Clay	(Belgium) Maxime Authom	6–7^{(4–7)}, 3–6
Win	1–2	May 2008	Pleven, Bulgaria F3	Futures	Clay	(France) Xavier Pujo	7–5, 3–6, 6–2
Win	2–2	Jun 2008	Sofia, Bulgaria F4	Futures	Clay	(Bulgaria) Tihomir Grozdanov	6–1, 6–3
Win	3–2	Nov 2008	Las Palmas, Spain F42	Futures	Hard	(Canada) Pierre-Ludovic Duclos	4–6, 6–2, 6–3
Loss	3–3	Feb 2009	Bagnoles-de-l'Orne, France F1	Futures	Clay (i)	(France) Julien Jeanpierre	1–6, 6–3, 3–6
Win	4–3	Mar 2009	Tipton, Great Britain F3	Futures	Hard (i)	(France) Stéphane Robert	7–6^{(7–4)}, 7–6^{(7–5)}
Win	5–3	May 2009	Pozzuoli, Italy F10	Futures	Clay	(Italy) Simone Vagnozzi	6–2, 6–2
Loss	5–4	Sep 2009	Mulhouse, France F14	Futures	Hard (i)	(Belgium) Niels Desein	6–7^{(1–7)}, 4–6
Win	6–4	Oct 2009	Glasgow, Great Britain F15	Futures	Hard (i)	(United Kingdom) Daniel Evans	6–0, 6–2
Loss	6–5	Oct 2009	Cardiff, Great Britain F16	Futures	Hard (i)	(Finland) Henri Kontinen	6–7^{(4–7)}, 5–7
Loss	6–6	Oct 2010	La Roche-sur-Yon, France F19	Futures	Hard (i)	(France) Clément Reix	3–6, 7–6^{(9–7)}, 6–7^{(8–10)}
Win	7–6	Mar 2011	Tipton, Great Britain F3	Futures	Hard (i)	(United Kingdom) Daniel Evans	6–2, 7–6^{(8–6)}
Loss	7–7	Apr 2011	Padova, Italy F6	Futures	Clay	(Austria) Daniel Köllerer	5–7, 1–6
Loss	7–8	May 2011	Newcastle, Great Britain F7	Futures	Clay	(Tunisia) Malek Jaziri	3–6, 4–6
Win	8–8	Jul 2011	Middelburg, Netherlands F4	Futures	Clay	(Russia) Victor Baluda	6–4, 6–4
Win	9–8	Jul 2011	Fano, Italy F19	Futures	Clay	(Argentina) Nicolás Pastor	6–4, 5–7, 6–2
Win	10–8	Jan 2012	Birkenhead, Great Britain F3	Futures	Hard (i)	(Poland) Jerzy Janowicz	7–6^{(7–5)}, 2–6, 6–2
Win	11–8	Jul 2013	Trier, Germany F10	Futures	Clay	(Bulgaria) Petar Trendafilov	6–4, 6–2
Loss	11–9	Aug 2013	Ostend, Belgium F7	Futures	Clay	(Belgium) Kimmer Coppejans	7–6^{(8–6)}, 1–6, 2–6
Win	12–9	Sep 2013	Bujumbura, Burundi F1	Futures	Clay	(Austria) Lukas Jastraunig	6–2, 6–1
Win	13–9	Nov 2013	Puerto de la Cruz, Spain F38	Futures	Carpet	(Spain) Roberto Ortega Olmedo	6–2, 6–3
Win	14–9	Mar 2014	Lille, France F4	Futures	Hard (i)	(France) Mathieu Rodrigues	6–2, 6–1
Loss	14–10	Mar 2014	Antalya, Turkey F8	Futures	Hard	(Czech Republic) Jan Mertl	6–7^{(6–8)}, 6–4, 4–6
Loss	14–11	Apr 2014	Doha, Qatar F1	Futures	Hard	(United Kingdom) Daniel Cox	3–6, 4–6
Win	15–11	Aug 2014	Piombino, Italy F29	Futures	Hard	(France) Martin Vaïsse	6–4, 7–6^{(7–3)}
Win	16–11	Oct 2014	Madrid, Spain F32	Futures	Hard	(Spain) Pablo Vivero González	6–3, 7–5
Loss	16–12	Nov 2014	Oslo, Norway F1	Futures	Hard (i)	(France) Jules Marie	0–6, 2–6
Loss	16–13	Mar 2015	Loulé, Portugal F3	Futures	Hard	(Portugal) Rui Machado	4–6, 6–7^{(6–8)}
Win	17–13	Mar 2015	Birkenhead, Great Britain F4	Futures	Hard (i)	(Croatia) Matija Pecotić	6–2, 6–4
Win	18–13	Mar 2015	Madrid, Spain F6	Futures	Hard	(Spain) Jaime Pulgar-Garcia	4–6, 6–1, 6–2
Loss	18–14	Apr 2015	Port El Kantaoui, Tunisia F12	Futures	Hard	(Belgium) Clément Geens	6–3, 4–6, 5–7
Loss	18–15	May 2015	Bol, Croatia F9	Futures	Clay	(Serbia) Miljan Zekić	7–6^{(7–4)}, 5–7, 2–6
Win	19–15	Jul 2015	Amstelveen, Netherlands F4	Futures	Clay	(Switzerland) Yann Marti	6–4, 6–4
Win	20–15	Mar 2016	Lille, France F4	Futures	Hard (i)	(Netherlands) Antal van der Duim	6–2, 6–4
Win	21–15	Apr 2016	Heraklion, Greece F4	Futures	Hard	(United Kingdom) Lloyd Glasspool	6–2, 7–5
Loss	21–16	Jul 2016	Middelkerke, Belgium F5	Futures	Hard	(Belgium) Ruben Bemelmans	3–6, 7–6^{(7–3)}, 1–6
Loss	21–17	Aug 2016	Béjar, Spain F24	Futures	Hard	(Spain) Andrés Artuñedo	2–6, 6–7^{(4–7)}
Loss	21–18	Oct 2016	Oliveira de Azeméis, Portugal F11	Futures	Hard	(Greece) Stefanos Tsitsipas	3–6, 6–4, 2–6
Win	22–18	Dec 2016	Ramat Gan, Israel F16	Futures	Hard	(France) Mick Lescure	6–3, 6–2
Win	23–18	Mar 2017	Faro, Portugal F2	Futures	Hard	(Austria) Lucas Miedler	6–4, 6–2
Win	24–18	Sep 2017	Oliveira de Azeméis, Portugal F20	Futures	Hard	(Serbia) Peđa Krstin	3–6, 7–6^{(7–5)}, 6–2
Loss	24–19	Nov 2017	Meitar, Israel F15	Futures	Hard	(France) Yannick Jankovits	5–7, 6–7^{(6–8)}
Win	25–19	Dec 2017	Ramat HaSharon, Israel F16	Futures	Hard	(Israel) Edan Leshem	7–6^{(7–4)}, 6–3
Loss	25–20	Jan 2018	Sharm El Sheikh, Egypt F1	Futures	Hard	(Russia) Aslan Karatsev	1–6, 2–6
Loss	25–21	Feb 2018	Glasgow, Great Britain F1	Futures	Hard (i)	(Netherlands) Scott Griekspoor	1–6, 6–7^{(5–7)}
Loss	25–22	Apr 2018	Djerba, Tunisia F16	Futures	Hard	(Turkey) Altuğ Çelikbilek	7–6^{(7–4)}, 3–6, 4–6
Win	26–22	Sep 2018	Plaisir, France F18	Futures	Hard (i)	(France) Antoine Cornut-Chauvinc	7–6^{(7–4)}, 6–2
Loss	26–23	Sep 2018	Oliveira de Azeméis, Portugal F18	Futures	Hard	(France) Gleb Sakharov	6–7^{(7–9)}, 4–6
Loss	26–24	Feb 2019	M15 Grenoble, France	World Tennis Tour	Hard (i)	(France) Lény Mitjana	3–6, 5–7
Win	27–24	Sep 2019	M25+H Plaisir, France	World Tennis Tour	Hard (i)	(Belgium) Christopher Heyman	6–3, 6–0
Loss	27–25	Feb 2021	M15 Monastir, Tunisia	World Tennis Tour	Hard	(United Kingdom) Stuart Parker	3–6, 6–4, 6–7^{(5–7)}
Win	28–25	May 2021	M15 Marbella, Spain	World Tennis Tour	Hard	(Chile) Diego Fernández Flores	6–2, 6–1
