= 1987 Bogaarden shooting =

Mass shooting in Pepingen, Belgium

- Location: Bogaarden and Denderwindeke, Belgium
- Date: 12 May 1987 c. 13:00 – c. 17:00 (CEST)
- Target: Decrem family
- Weapons: .22-caliber rifle Cylinder-loaded carbine
- Deaths: 8 (including the perpetrator)
- Injuries: 3
- Perpetrator: Michel Van Wijnendaele
- Motive: Anger over failed sports career

On 12 May 1987, a mass shooting took place in Bogaarden, Flemish Brabant, Belgium, and continued in nearby Denderwindeke. Seven people were killed and three others were injured before the perpetrator, 28-year-old Michel Van Wijnendaele, killed himself after being found by police.

The shooting is the deadliest single-perpetrator mass murder in Belgium.

== Background ==
According to Penitentiair Oriëntatie Centrum criminologist Wim Depreeuw, prior to the Bogaarden shooting, there had been fourteen murder-suicides with 37 deaths, including perpetrators, in post-World War II Belgium. Of these, the two deadliest had seven fatalities, including perpetrators. Most of these incidents were familicides, with victims most often including intimate partners and children, often generating both domestic and international media attention. Depreeuw noted that mass murders who do not kill themselves, or attempt to, usually targeted people outside of the perpetrator's familial or social circle.

== Incident ==
=== Initial shootings ===
The perpetrator, armed with a .22 caliber rifle drove to Bogaarden, a village of Pepingen, in his Opel Kadett, parking his vehicle near three farmsteads on Bautebrugstraat. He first entered the house of the Derycke (also spelled De Rijcke) family, killing Marie-Thérèse Walravens (also spelled Walraevens) and her young son Ludovic Derycke, who were both shot in the head inside the living room, shortly after lunch had been laid out. Both had come back home at about 12:00 after Ludovic was fetched from kindergarten in Heikruis, with police and court officials believing they were killed because the perpetrator wanted to eliminate potential witnesses, likely having spotted the mother-son pair as they were cycling by and following them into their home.

The perpetrator then stepped onto the property of the Decrem (also spelled De Crem) family, directly opposite of the Derycke farmstead, where he shot their guard dog Kim and sheep dog Tibo in the yard. At about 13:00, the gunman entered the farmhouse, where the family had gathered to set the main table for lunch, and opened fire, killing the farmer couple Edgard Decrem and Liliane Nechelput, their adult son Christian, and Liliane's parents Jean-Baptiste Nechelput and Marguerite Vandermissen. The second son, 22-year-old Guy Decrem, had stayed upstairs to get dressed after tending to the cows. Guy initially looked out his window for the noise, only to see the family dogs dead. After running downstairs, Guy Decrem saw the intruder next to the bodies of his family and attempted to disarm him, but he was shot in the stomach and shoulder. The perpetrator subsequently fled the house.

Shortly after, the heavily injured Guy Decrem managed to walk out of the house and reach the Derycke residence across the street, banging on the front door, unaware that the two occupants had also been murdered. At about 13:20, he went to the third farmstead on the street and told his neighbours that his entire family was killed before collapsing from his wound. Awareness of the murders spread quickly and by the time emergency services arrived, Bautebrugstraat was crowded with villagers. The double murder initially went unnoticed until farmer Jacques Derycke, who had spent the day working in the stable, noticed the packed street and went to ask his wife about this at the house, only to find her and their son dead.

=== Police response ===
After being told of the additional murders, the Rijkswacht were unsure how to proceed, as they had no information about the perpetrator besides the type of ammunition he used. It was first assumed that it was personal dispute such as a family feud, though other possibilities such as a contract killing or randomly targeted attack were also considered. Involvement by the Nijvel Gang, who had also committed mass murders in the past, was quickly ruled out. A few hours later, survivor Guy Decrem regained consciousness at Erasmus Hospital, initially asking for his father, believing his family had only been injured. He provided a chronology of the shootings to investigators and identified the perpetrator as a "redhead in a blue Opel Kadett", with both Guy Decrem and Jacques Derycke stating that they knew no one of that description. In the afternoon, at around 17:00, the Rijkswacht received a call of a third connected shooting in Denderwindeke, part of Ninove, 15 kilometres (9.3 mi) from Bogaarden, in which a 59-year-old man and his 87-year-old mother were shot and injured with a carbine. The scene had been found by the man's son, who told a neighbour to call police and identified the perpetrator as his brother-in-law Michel Van Wijnendaele and his description was matched to the shooting in Bogaarden. The victims stated that Van Wijnendaele had showed up, openly carrying the carbine, and invited his father-in-law to go outside with him, saying he wanted to show him how to load and use the gun. After the elder man and his mother voiced reluctance, Van Wijnendaele opened fire without warning. Rijkswacht subsequently initiated a nationwide manhunt.

In the evening, at about 19:30, an auto shop owner in Chièvres alerted traffic police after spotting Van Wijnendaele refuelling his car at a gas station. Officers caught up to Van Wijnendaele in Brugelette, leading to a car chase that ended after a few minutes, when police cars boxed in his vehicle in Sirault, near Mons. At around 21:00, as police closed in, Van Wijnendaele grabbed his rifle from the passenger seat and committed suicide by shooting himself in the head.

== Victims ==
The Decrem family were well-regarded dairy farmers and amongst the wealthiest residents in the village. Edgard "Edgar" Decrem, a local leader of the Stevenists, had previously gained fame in July 1986 for discovering a car behind his cowshed, containing stolen gold and jewelry, which he handed over to police. A third son of the Decrem family was not present as he had gone to work. The three critically wounded were treated at Erasmus Hospital in Anderlecht. Van Wijnendaele's father-in-law was discharged after a few hours while the other two remained hospitalised in life-threatening conditions.

=== Killed ===
- Jean-Baptiste Nechelput, 90
- Marguerite Vandersmissen a.k.a. Margriet Nechelput, 84, wife of Jean-Baptiste Nechelput
- Liliane Nechelput, 46, daughter of Jean-Baptiste Nechelput and Margriet Vandersmissen
- Edgard Decrem, 54, husband of Liliane Decrem
- Christian Decrem, 20, son of Liliane and Edgard Decrem
- Marie-Thérèse Derycke-Walravens, 37
- Ludovic Derycke, 2, son of Marie-Thérèse Walravens

== Perpetrator ==
Michel Van Wijnendaele (also spelled van Wijnendaele) was a native of Denderwindeke and married since 1979, with three children at the time of the murders. Van Wijnendaele was formerly a clerk at the National Bank in Brussels, a job he had little interest in and quit on 1 April 1987, seeking to become a professional cyclist, despite already being 28 with no experience in the sport. Van Wijnendaele had joined a cycling club earlier on and later applied for an amateur licence with the Royal Belgian Cycling League, but he was described as "possess[ing] no talent, not even a small one". He had never finished a race while with the club and competed only once as part of a peloton during an amateur race, a day before the shooting, quitting within the first lap after falling off his bike. He was previously recorded in 1985 for an attempted suicide by drug overdose.

== Investigation ==
The public prosecutor's office stated that the .22 rifle used in the initial shooting had been in Van Wijnendaele's ownership since before his marriage. The carbine used at the second shooting site was newly purchased the previous week. A motive was not immediately apparent. Besides the initial assumption of a "fit of sudden madness", there were early suspicions that Van Wijnendaele may have acted under the influence of pervitin, which was regularly used in illicit sports doping amongst race cyclists. Investigators later discounted the theory, though a court nevertheless ordered an autopsy. The court also investigated potential ties between the Decrem family and Van Wijnendaele. There was an early claim that Van Wijnendaele's brother had died in a car crash the prior year, possibly due to one of the Decrem dogs. It was also noted that the shooting occurred on the same day as the funeral of a woman from Ninove, near Van Wijnendaele's hometown, who was married to a relative of the Decrem family, having died along with two of her children in a car crash in Eizeringen. The official investigation stated that the Decrems and the Deryckes did not know Van Wijnendaele.

It was later concluded that Van Winjnendaele's lack of success and other life failings caused by leaving his well-paid employment led him to act out his anger against the Pajottenland, where he had spent much of his time training. Police stated that the Decrem farm was specifically targeted, likely because their residence was next to his usual training route.

== Aftermath ==
For a few days, the murders received extensive press coverage as a rare instance of violence in the rural area of Brabant. A funeral march was organised for the Decrem and Derycke families by the Stevenists in the afternoon of 18 May. Locally, following the funeral of the victims, it was decided to not commemorate the murders, which fell into obscurity. There was a popular theory that Van Wijnendaele had been inspired by the movie In Cold Blood, which had recently aired on Dutch-language television, and imitated the family murder depicted in the movie as a form of Werther effect. Communications scientist Gust Demeyer of KU Leuven was skeptical of the claim, stating that there was not enough research into the effects of violence in mass media. Some locals continued to believe the involvement of organised crime related to the earlier car find, or that the shooting was the result of an affair between Edgard Decrem and Michel Van Wijnendaele's wife.

In 2025, journalists Louis van Dievel and Michel Wuyts authored the novel "Rik III, een Vlaams wielerdrama", loosely inspired by the murders. Van Dievel had reported on the murders at the time during employment at VRT while Wuyts, a sports writer specialising in professional cycling, had taken an interest in the case due to Van Wijnendaele's failed sports career. They emphasised that the book was not biographical and "85% made up".
