= Galmaarden =

- Municipality
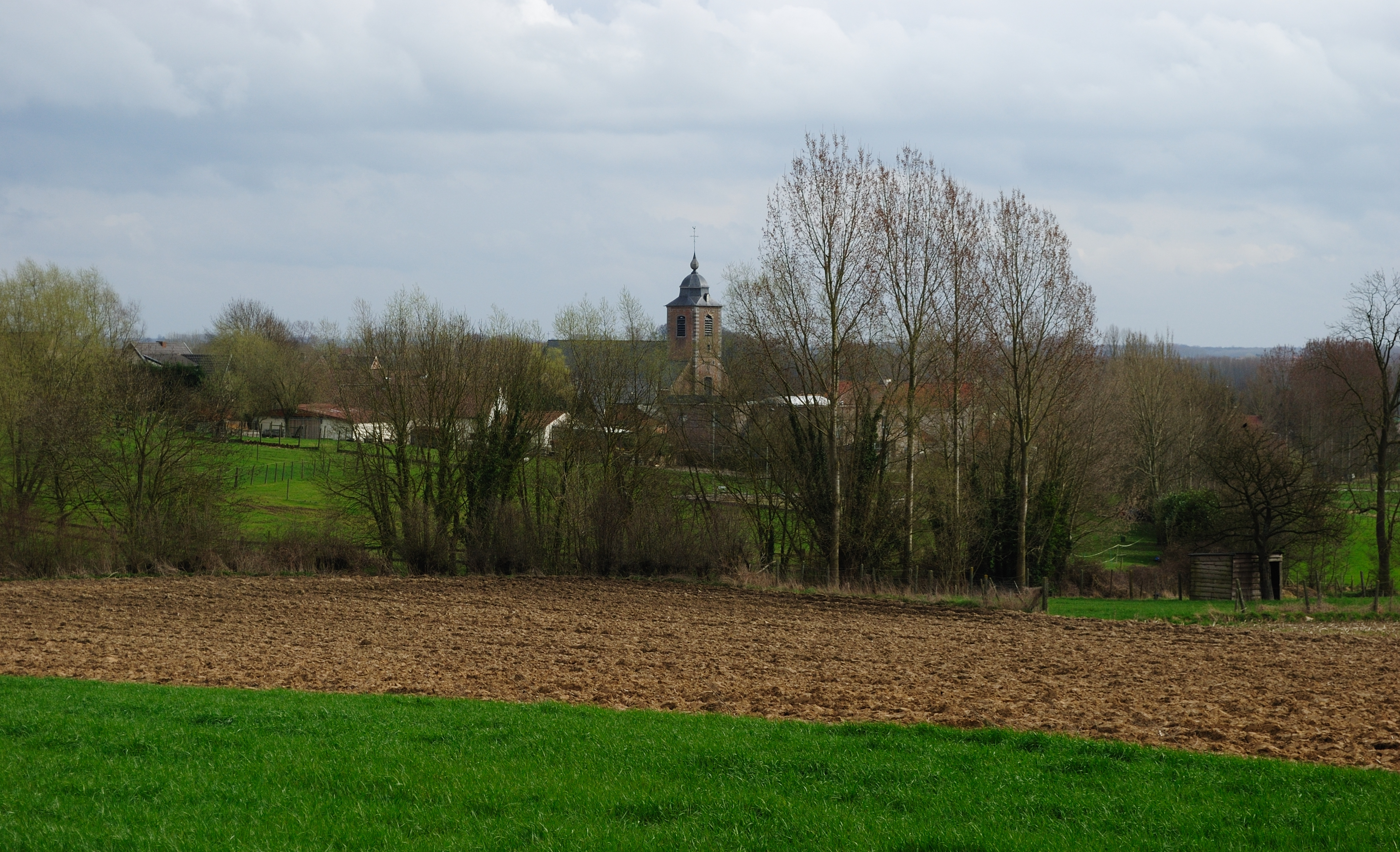
- Vollezele

- Flag Coat of arms

- Location of Galmaarden in Flemish Brabant
- Interactive map of Galmaarden
- Location in Belgium
- Coordinates: 50.75°N 03.99°E
- Country: Belgium
- Community: Flemish Community
- Region: Flemish Region
- Province: Flemish Brabant
- Arrondissement: Halle-Vilvoorde

Government
  - Mayor: Patrick Decat (CD&V)
  - Governing party: CD&V
- Postal codes: 1570
- NIS code: 23023
- Area codes: 054
- Website: www.galmaarden.be

Galmaarden (Dutch pronunciation: [ˈɣɑlmaːrdə(n)]; French: Gammerages, French pronunciation: [ɡamʁaʒ]) is a small town in the municipality of Pajottegem in the Belgian province of Flemish Brabant. It is also situated in the Pajottenland.
