= Kruikenburg Castle =

- Kasteel Kruikenburg
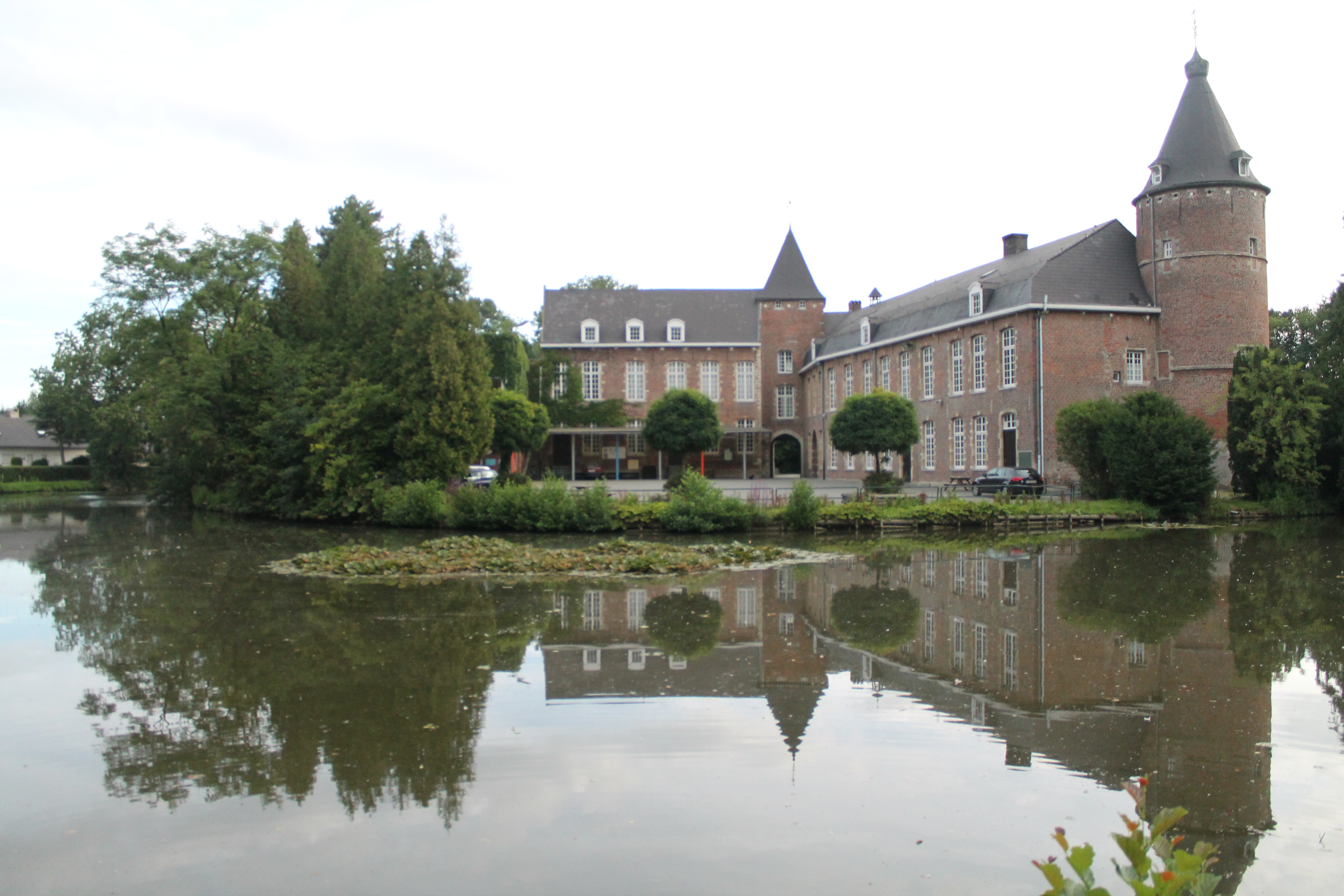
- Interactive map of the Kruikenburg Castle area
- Alternative names: Cruyckembourg

General information
- Location: Ternat, Statiestraat 37
- Coordinates: 50.8711°N 4.1707°E
- Current tenants: Institute of the Brothers of the Christian Schools
- Renovated: 1714

Kruikenburg Castle (Dutch: Kasteel Kruikenburg; French: Château de Cruykenbourg) is a listed building in the village of Ternat, Belgium. It was the seat of the lordship of Kruikenburg, which included the villages of Ternat, Sint-Katarina-Lombeek and Wambeek. A medieval foundation, the castle was extensively remodelled in the 16th and 18th centuries, giving it its current appearance. In 1662 the lord of Kruikenburg was elevated to the title of count. In the 20th century the castle became a house of the Lassalian Brothers.

== People ==
- Everard t'Serclaes (c.1320–1388), lord of Kruikenburg.
