= Pajottegem =

Municipality in Flemish Brabant, Belgium

- Municipality
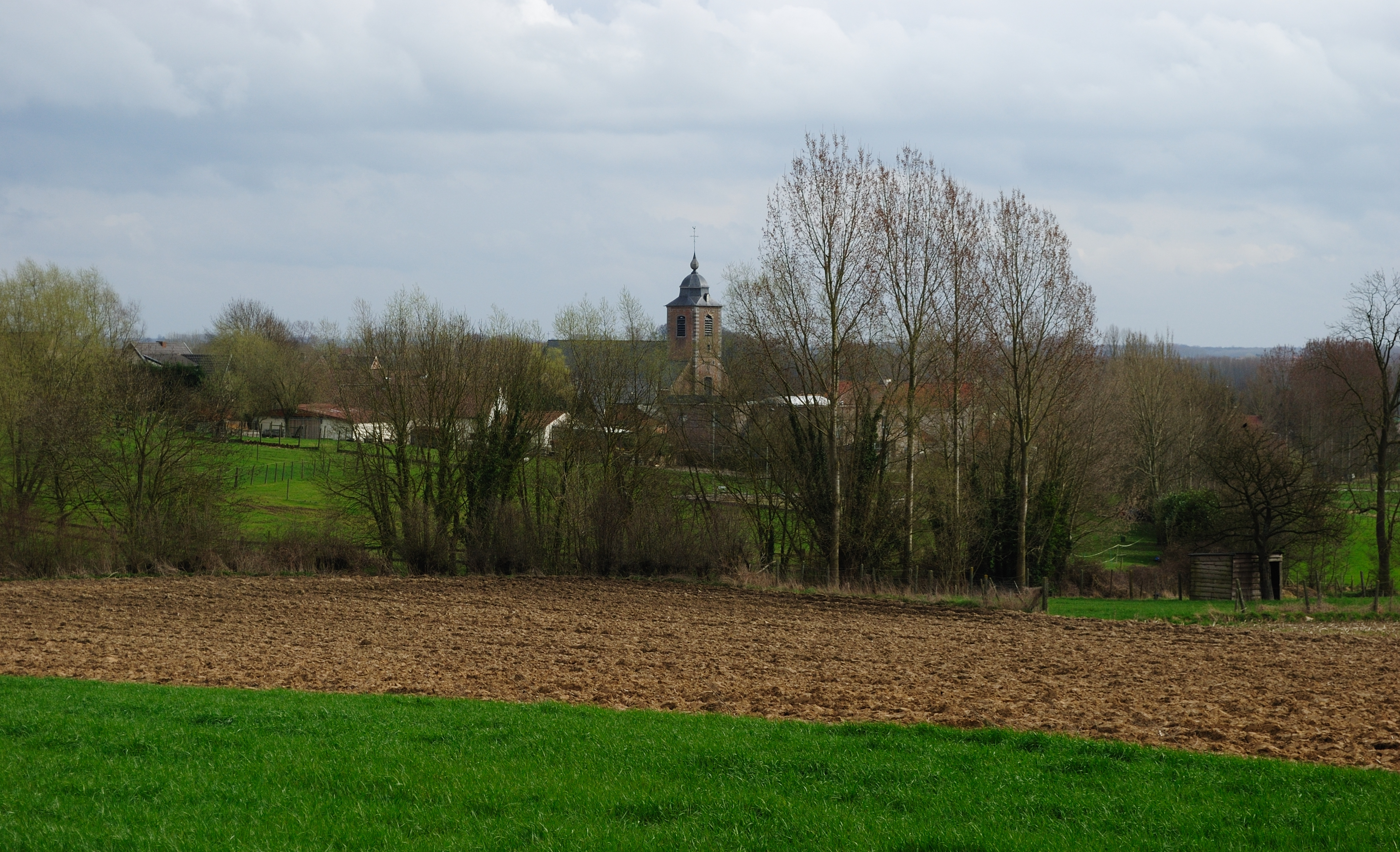
- Vollezele, Ternat

- Flag Coat of arms
- Interactive map of Pajottegem
- Location in Belgium
- Coordinates: 50°45′13″N 04°02′31″E
- Country: Belgium
- Community: Flemish Community
- Region: Flemish Region
- Province: Flemish Brabant
- Arrondissement: Halle-Vilvoorde

Government
  - Mayor: Kris Poelaert
  - Governing party: CD&V

Area
  - Total: 120.16 km^{2} (46.39 sq mi)
- Demonym: Pajottegemnaars
- Postal codes: 1540; 1541; 1570; 1755
- NIS code: 23106
- Area codes: 02, 053
- Website: www.pajottegem.be

Pajottegem is a municipality located in the Belgian province of Flemish Brabant.

Pajottegem is the result of the merger of Galmaarden, Gooik, and Herne on January 1, 2025.
