= Wambeek =

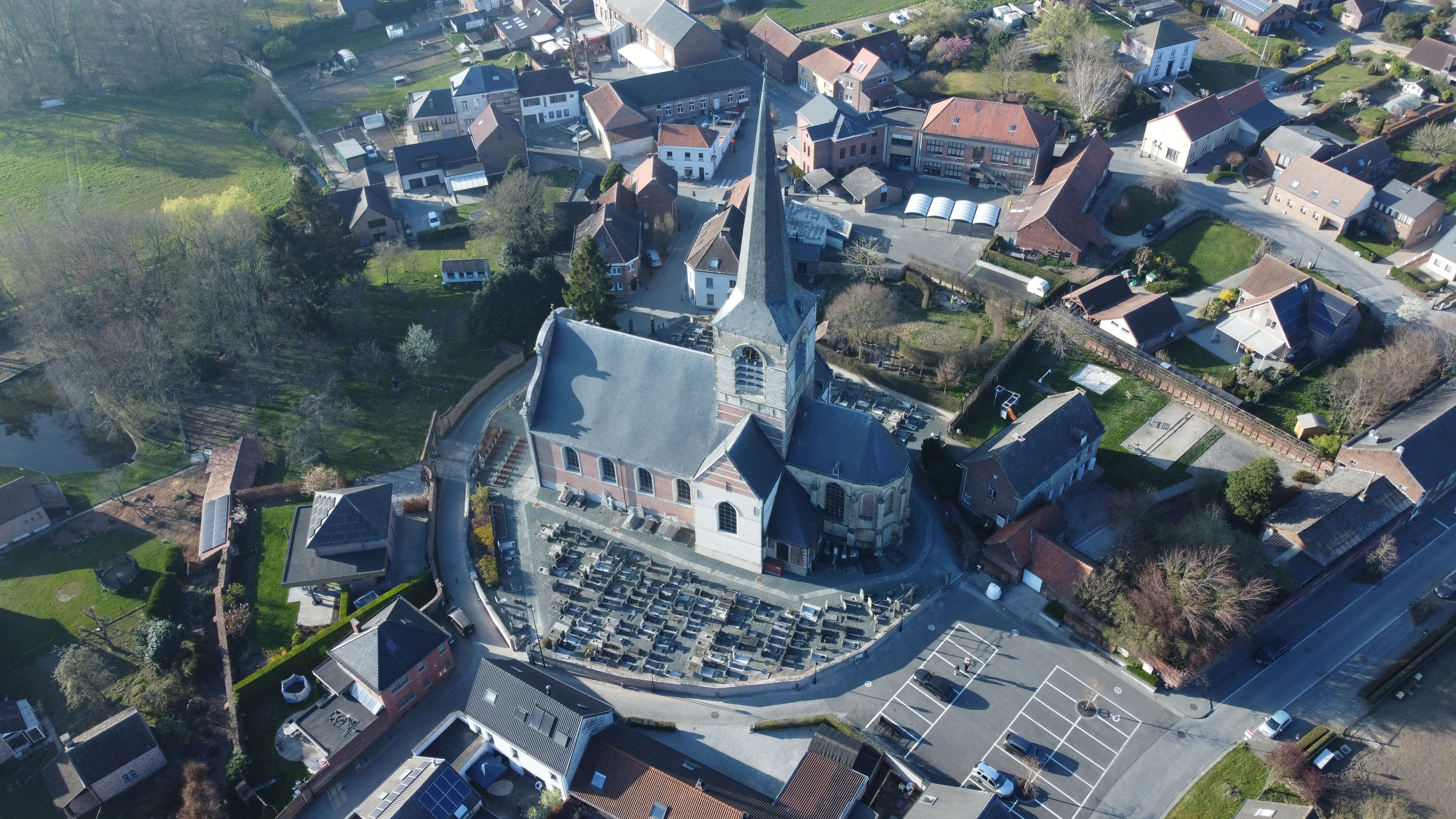
- Wambeek

- Location within Belgium Location within Europe
- Coordinates: 50°51′12″N 04°09′44″E
- Country: Belgium
- Region: Flanders
- Province: Flemish Brabant
- Municipality: Ternat

Wambeek is a village and a district in the municipality of Ternat, in Flemish Brabant, Belgium. It lies in Pajottenland.

The first written mention of the village is from 877, when it was described as an estate belonging to the Collegiate Church of St. Gertrude, Nivelles. From the 12th century, it belonged to the Duchy of Brabant. The historical centre of the village is listed. The village church traces its origins to the 8th century, but the current structure dates largely from the 16th and 18th centuries.
