= Mollem =

Village in Flemish Brabant, Belgium

Coordinates: 50.930833°N 4.227473°E

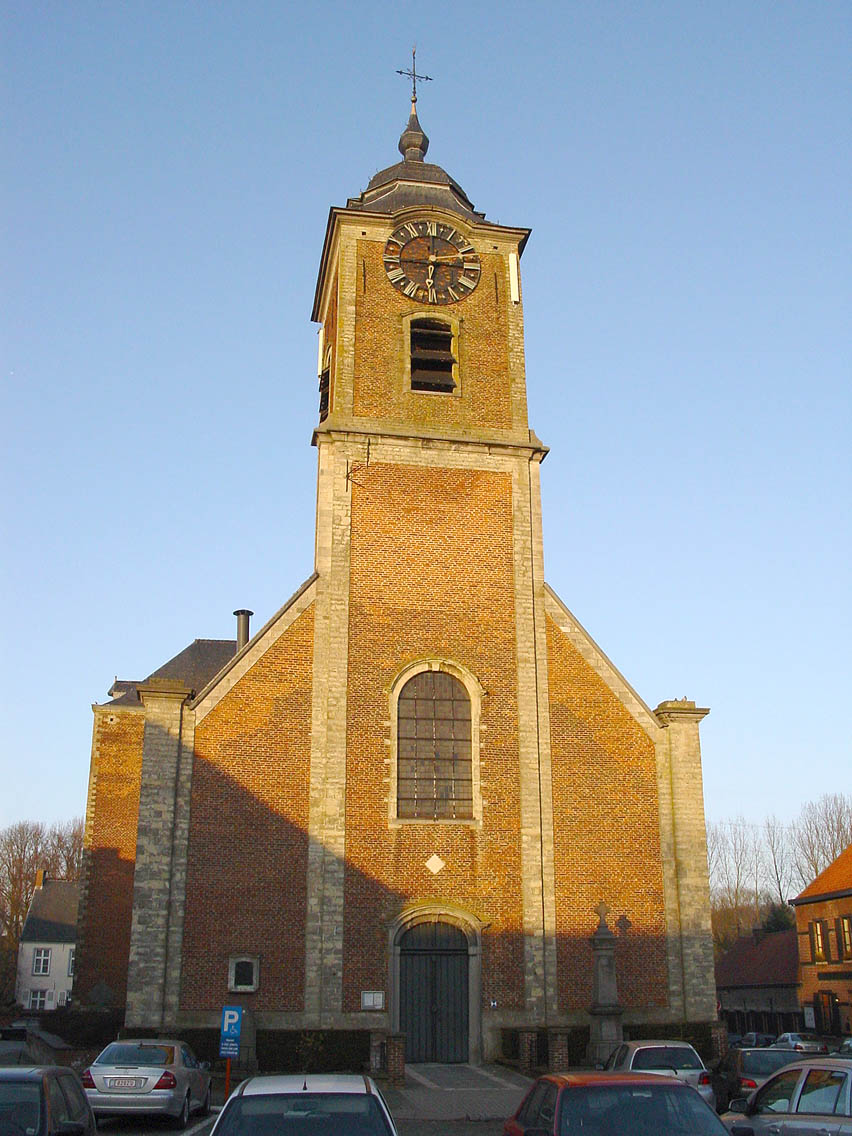
Mollem church

Mollem is a village in the municipality of Asse, Flemish Brabant, Belgium. It used to be a municipality on its own but now is a part of Asse.

Mollem has a railway station on line 60 between Jette and Dendermonde.

The hamlet of Bollebeek is close to the village.

Mollem's most famous place is "Rie van Pol", a bar that has remained unchanged throughout the years. Every year a lot of visitors (mostly foreign) visit Mollem just to visit this place.

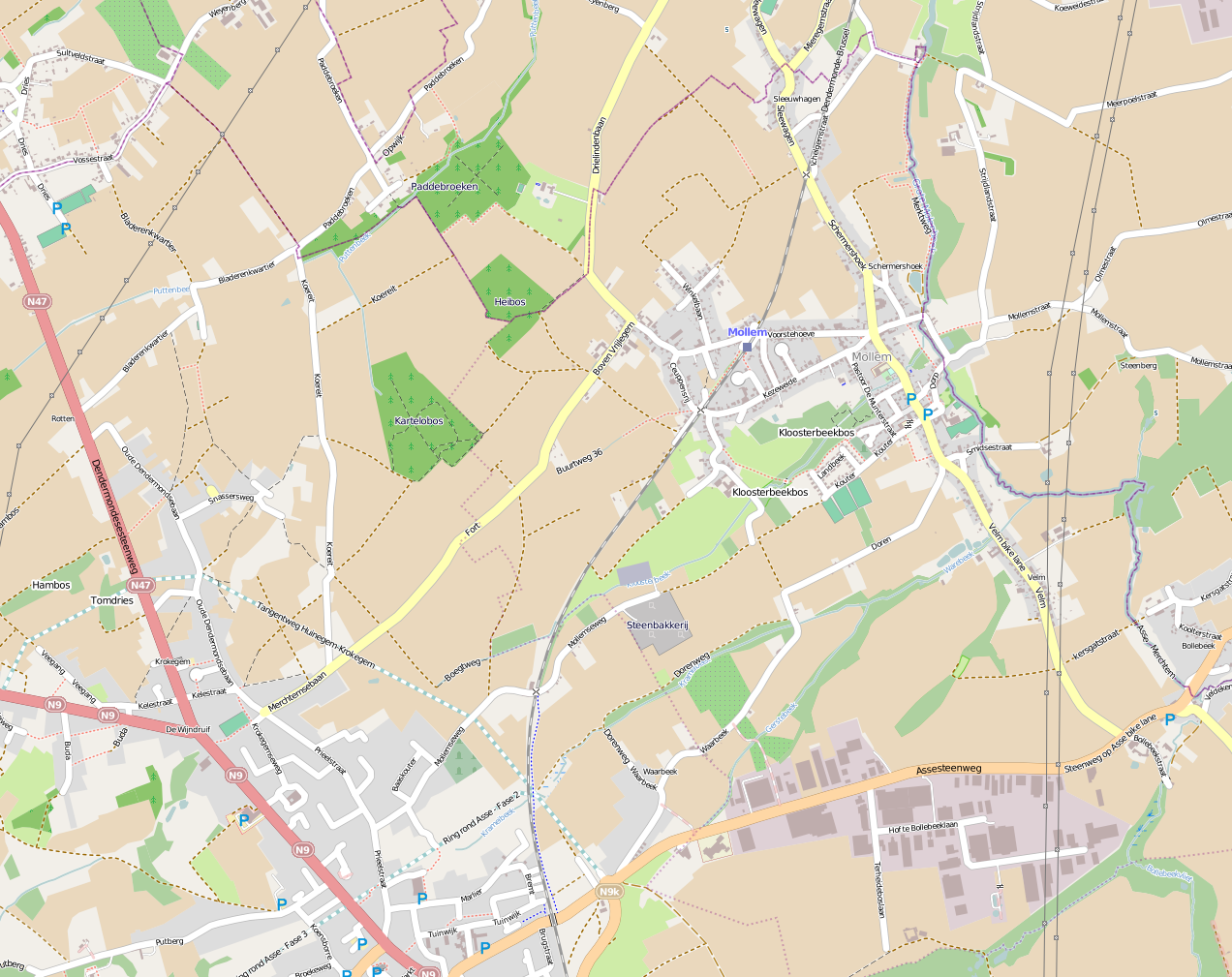
Plan of Mollem
