= Elingen =

Village in Pepingen, Belgium

Coordinates: 50.7797°N 4.171°E

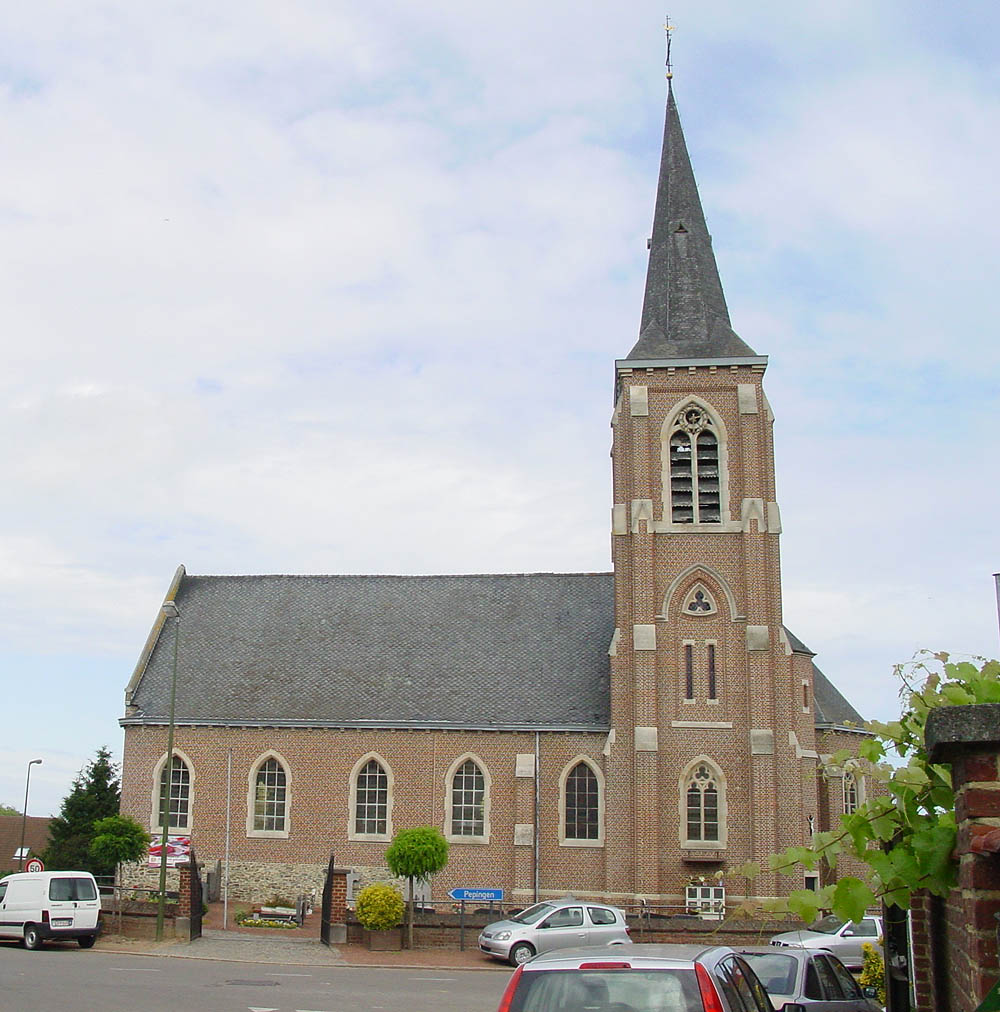
St Amandus' Church, Elingen

Elingen is a village in the municipality of Pepingen, in the Belgian province of Flemish Brabant. The parish church of St Amandus with its churchyard is registered as an element of the built heritage (onroerend erfgoed) of Flanders.
