= Anthony van Zijlvelt =

Dutch Golden Age engraver and painter (1640s–1700s)

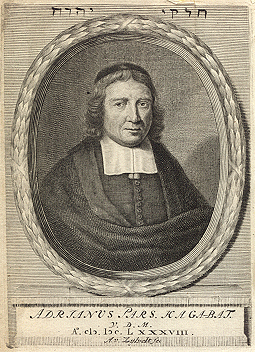
Engraved portrait of Adriaan Pars, by Zijlevelt

Anthony van Zijlvelt (1640s in Amsterdam – 1700s in Amsterdam), was a Dutch Golden Age engraver and painter.

According to the RKD he made portrait prints after Pieter Dubordieu and Joachim von Sandrart, but also of his own invention. He was also a painter and draughtsman of marines.
