= Pepingen =

- Municipality
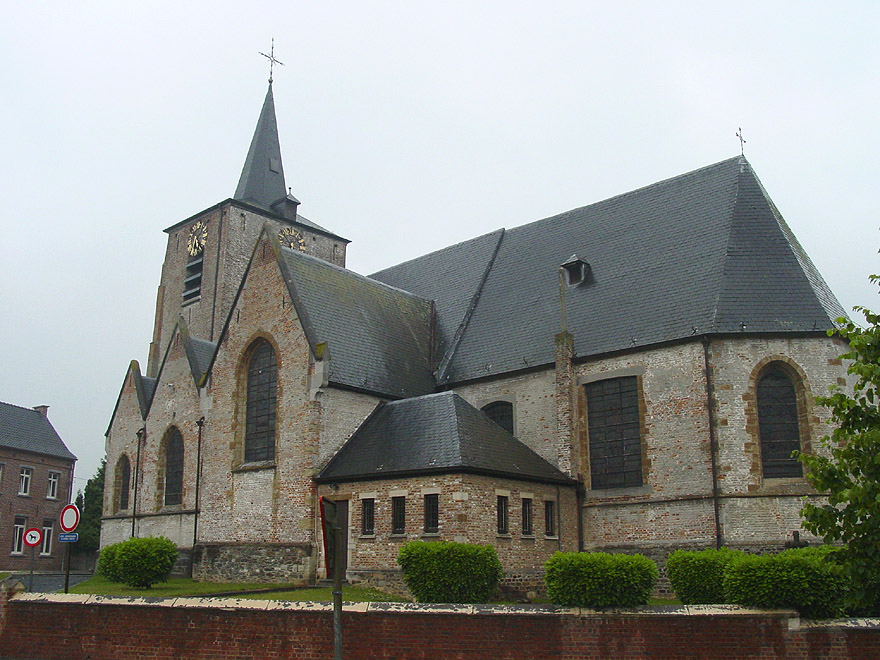
- Pepingen church

- Flag Coat of arms

- Location of Pepingen in Flemish Brabant
- Interactive map of Pepingen
- Location in Belgium
- Coordinates: 50°45′N 04°09′E
- Country: Belgium
- Community: Flemish Community
- Region: Flemish Region
- Province: Flemish Brabant
- Arrondissement: Halle-Vilvoorde

Government
  - Mayor: Eddy Timmermans
  - Governing party: LVB-LIJSTvdBURGER

Area
  - Total: 35.93 km^{2} (13.87 sq mi)

Population (2018-01-01)
  - Total: 4,372
  - Density: 121.7/km^{2} (315.2/sq mi)
- Postal codes: 1670, 1671, 1673, 1674
- NIS code: 23064
- Area codes: 02
- Website: www.pepingen.be

Pepingen (Dutch pronunciation: [ˈpeːpɪŋə(n)]) is a municipality located in the Belgian province of Flemish Brabant. The municipality comprises the villages of Beert, Bellingen, Bogaarden, Elingen, Heikruis and Pepingen proper. It is also situated in the Pajottenland. On January 1, 2006, Pepingen had a total population of 4,352. The total area is 36.05 km^{2} which gives a population density of 121 inhabitants per km^{2}.
