= Ternat =

- Municipality
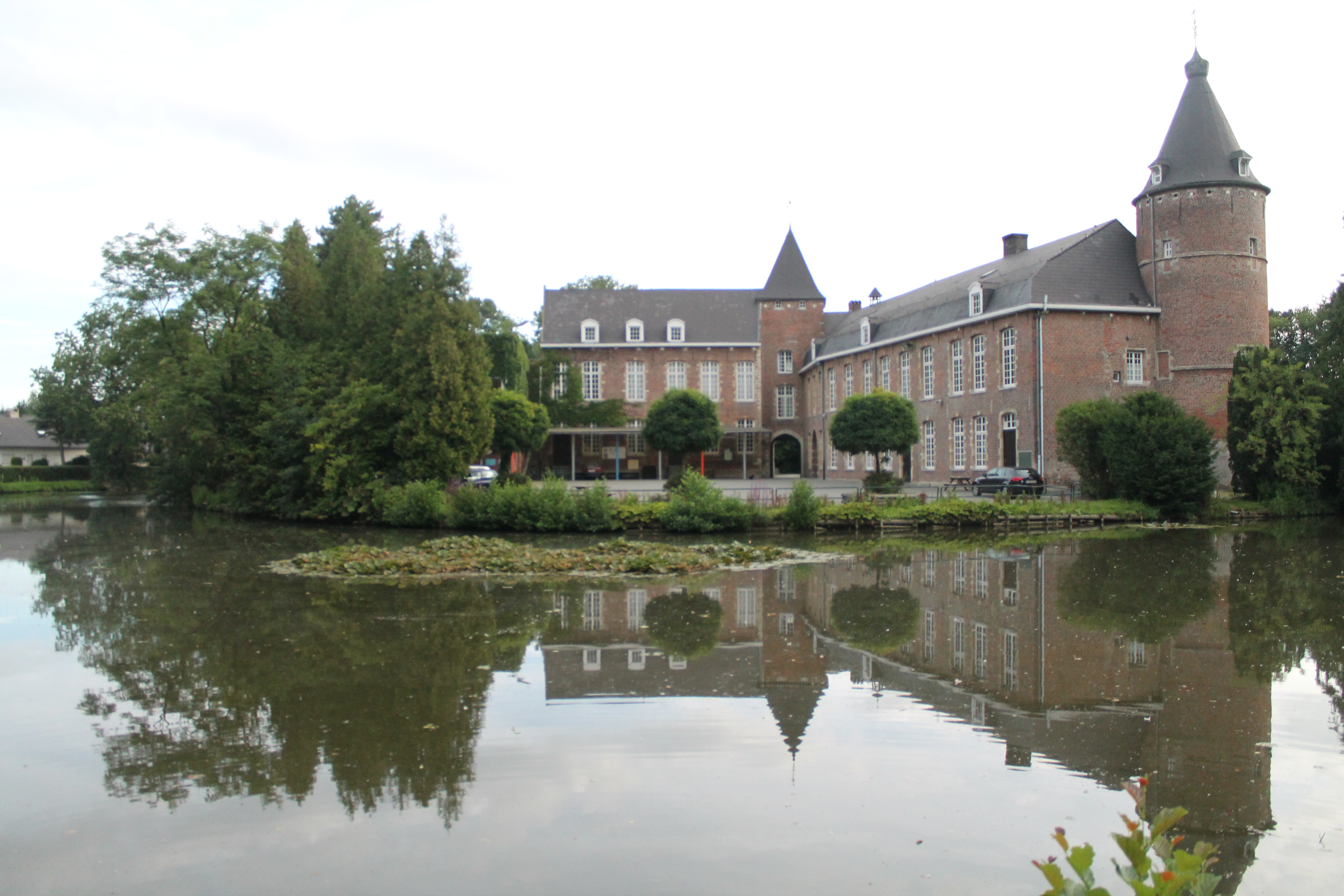
- Kruikenburg Castle, Ternat

- Flag Coat of arms

- Location of Ternat in Flemish Brabant
- Interactive map of Ternat
- Location in Belgium
- Coordinates: 50°52′N 04°11′E
- Country: Belgium
- Community: Flemish Community
- Region: Flemish Region
- Province: Flemish Brabant
- Arrondissement: Halle-Vilvoorde

Government
  - Mayor: Michel Vanderhasselt (CD&V en Volks)
  - Governing parties: CD&V en Volks, Voor Ternat

Area
  - Total: 24.71 km^{2} (9.54 sq mi)

Population (2025-01-01)
  - Total: 16,665
  - Density: 674.4/km^{2} (1,747/sq mi)
- Postal codes: 1740-1742
- NIS code: 23086
- Area codes: 02, 053
- Website: www.ternat.be

Ternat (Dutch pronunciation: [tərˈnɑt]; also French: Ternath) is a municipality located in the Belgian province of Flemish Brabant. The municipality comprises the villages of Sint-Katherina-Lombeek, Ternat proper and Wambeek. It is also situated in the Pajottenland. On January 1, 2018 Ternat had a total population of 15.481. The total area is 24.48 km^{2} which gives a population density of 597 inhabitants per km^{2}.

The village of Ternat is the site of a medieval sandstone church and the 12th-century Kruikenburg Castle, extensively remodelled in the 17th century. The local authority offices are housed in an 18th-century mansion.

== Notable people ==
- Everard t'Serclaes (c. 1320–1388)
- Pogge den Boer (1821–1890)
