= Asse =

- Municipality
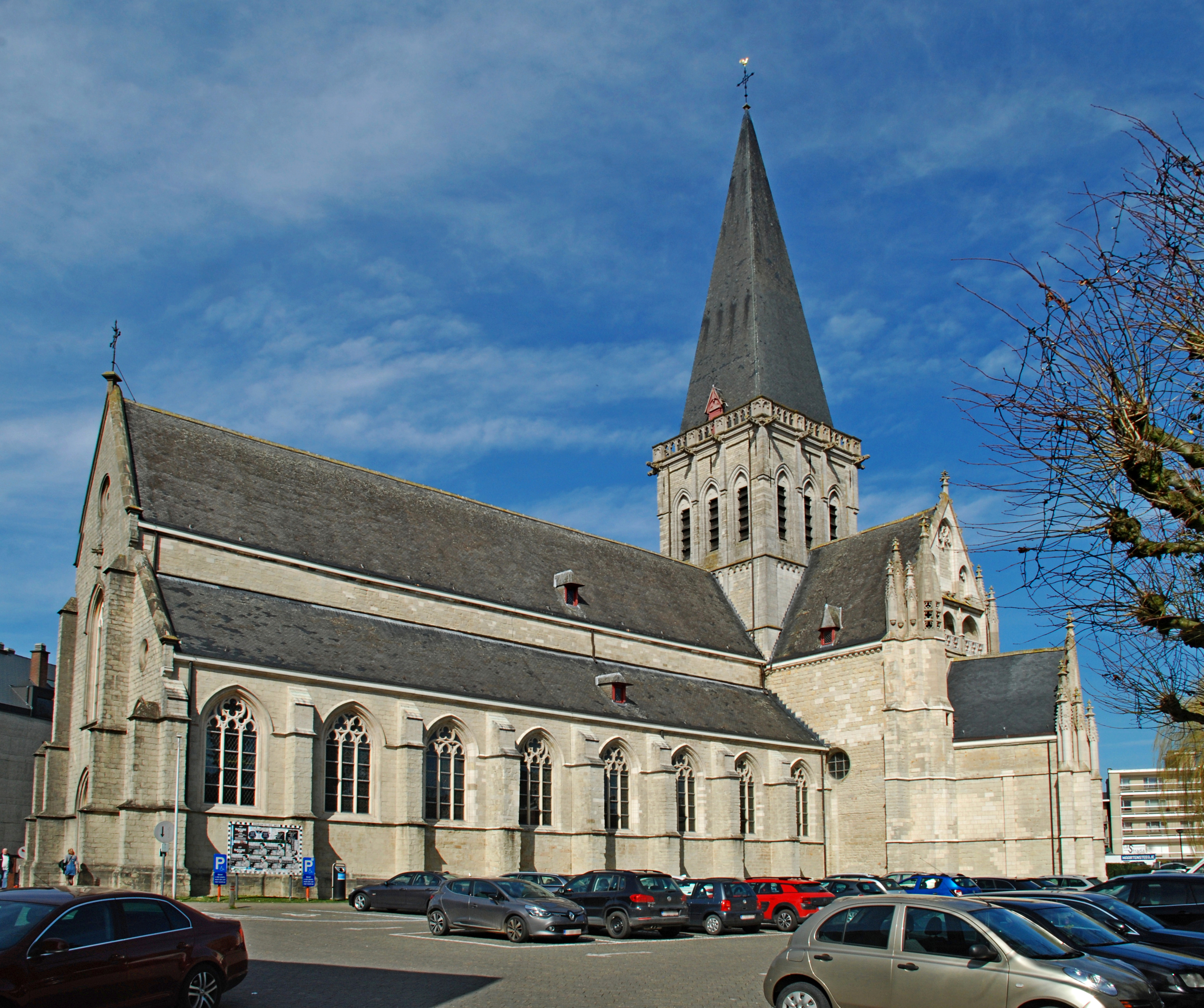
- St Martin's Church (Sint-Martinuskerk)

- Flag Coat of arms

- Asse in the Province of Flemish Brabant
- Interactive map of Asse
- Location in Belgium
- Coordinates: 50°54′N 04°12′E
- Country: Belgium
- Community: Flemish Community
- Region: Flemish Region
- Province: Flemish Brabant
- Arrondissement: Halle-Vilvoorde

Government
  - Mayor: Koen Van Elsen (CD&V)
  - Governing parties: CD&V, N-VA

Area
  - Total: 50.22 km^{2} (19.39 sq mi)

Population (2018-01-01)
  - Total: 32,958
  - Density: 656.3/km^{2} (1,700/sq mi)
- Postal codes: 1730, 1731
- NIS code: 23002
- Area codes: 052 - 02
- Website: www.asse.be

Asse (Dutch pronunciation: [ˈɑsə]) is a municipality located in the Belgian province of Flemish Brabant. It comprises the towns of Asse proper, Bekkerzeel, Kobbegem, Mollem, Relegem and Zellik. Asse is also situated in the Pajottenland. As of 2020, Asse had a total population of 32,958. The total area is 49.64 km^{2} which gives a population density of circa 660 inhabitants per km^{2}.

== History ==
Asse (formerly spelt "Assche") was probably inhabited by the Celtic tribe of the Nervii. The name itself probably comes from a pre-Celtic word meaning "water" (cf Esch-, Es- and Axe- prefixes elsewhere in Europe). It was probably inhabited from an early date; stone tools have been found in various locations. The fertility of the soil and the relief which rises above the wetter plains of present-day Flanders would also suggest that this would have been an early area of settlement.

From the middle of the first century, a Roman military road connected it to the capital of the Roman province of Nervii in Bavay (Bagacum Nerviorum). It continued northwards as far as the naval port at present-day Rumst, with various side roads to the East and West. It is possible that there was a Roman military camp to the south west of the present town centre in what is now known as "borgstad", though its role has not been clearly proven.

What is sure is that Asse grew to be a substantial settlement or vicus at an, at least locally, important road junction. Though no Roman buildings are extant there have been frequent archaeological finds including in 2007 a pottery and in 2008 a section of a (perhaps intra-urban) Roman road. It is possible that there was local cult of Epona as a large number of clay horse figurines, presumably votive offerings, have been found.

It is presumed that the Germanic language, which evolved into present-day Dutch, was introduced during the Frankish invasions in the late fourth and fifth centuries. Place-name study would at least suggest that but there are no extant written sources.

During the Carolingian period Asse was part of the region (gouw) of Brabant. During the period of the Viking invasions it would seem that there was a relatively important fortified site (see the Vita Berlindis) in Asse. From 1085 or 1086 Asse was part of the Duchy of Brabant under the Dukes of Leuven. The local vassal of the Duke was known as the "Heer van Asse" (i.e. the Lord of Asse) who was the Duke's hereditary standard bearer.

Asse was situated on the cross roads of both north–south as well as east–west trade routes, having a fertile, easily cultivated and well-drained soil. It therefore grew to be a regionally important centre and a relatively important military-strategic one. Asse has often been the subject of military campaigns and has been recorded as having been burnt down several times.

=== Ancien Régime ===
The St Martins church gained some local fame as a centre of pilgrimage connected to the miraculous blossoming of a tree in which a Host had been hidden and the equally miraculous appearance of a cross – the Miracles of the Holy Cross. During this period much of the power was inherited by the descendants of John II of Cottereau, Lord of Assche, he placed some important coloured windows in the church and was buried there. His descendants today still are family of the current Marquess of Assche.

In continuation of its role as seat of an important judicial court under the Ancien Régime, Asse was made capital of a canton during the French Revolutionary and Napoleonic Period.

Lacking any mineral resources, and being far from any navigable watercourses and being in close proximity to other larger centres such as Aalst, Dendermonde and Brussels, Asse never developed into an important commercial, political or industrial centre but remained a locally important market town. There was some brewing and marketing of the local hop production.

It is now a commuting town for Brussels with a number of light industrial and commercial activities.

== Notable people ==
- (Knight) Léonard de Selliers de Moranville (1803-1856) was a lawyer and school inspector in Asse. He was the father of lieutenant general Antonin de Selliers de Moranville, Chief of staff of the Belgian Army in 1914, and the grandfather of tennis player Anne de Borman, née de Selliers de Moranville (1881 – 1962), who represented Belgium at the 1920 Summer Olympics and 1924 Summer Olympics .
- Femke Van den Driessche, Belgian cyclist
- Paul De Keersmaeker (1929 - 2022), former mayor of Asse, and former Secretary of State.
