= Relegem =

Town in Flemish Brabant, Belgium

Coordinates: 50.90°N 4.28°E

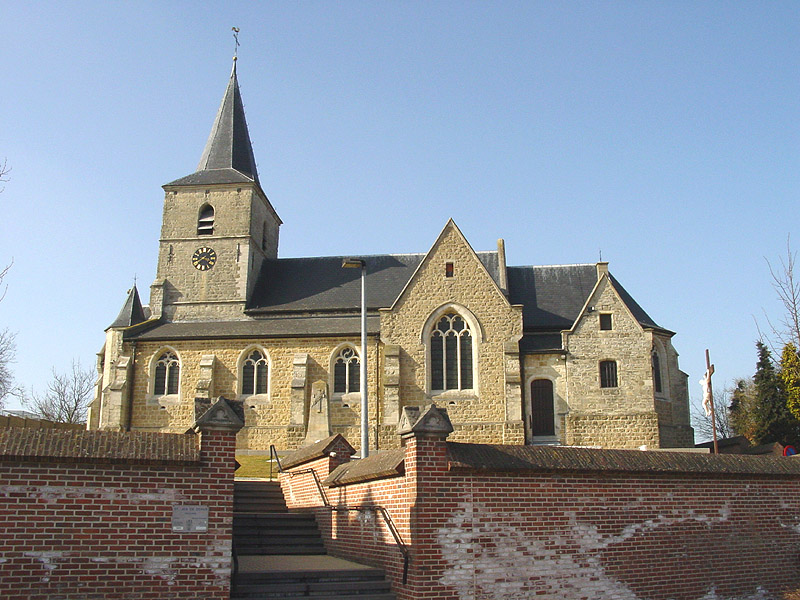
St. Jan de Doper Church, Relegem

Relegem is a town and deelgemeente in the municipality of Asse in Flemish Brabant, Belgium. Relegem was its own municipality until January 1, 1977 when it was merged with Asse as part of the fusion of the Belgian municipalities. Just before the merger, it had an area of 3.56 km^{2} (1.37 sq mi), and a total of 1116 inhabitants.

== Evolution of population ==
=== 19th century ===
Year	1806	1816	1830	1846	1856	1866	1876	1880	1890
Population	260	321	385	424	424	438	441	455	468
Note: census results as of December 31 of that year

=== 20th century until fusion with Asse ===
Year	1900	1910	1920	1930	1947	1961	1970	1976
Population	495	514	542	593	535	631	841	1116
Note: census results as of December 31 of that year; no separate data available for Relegem since 1976

== Notable inhabitants ==
- Johan Boskamp
