= Chenogne massacre =

1945 American war crime

- Part of the Battle of the Bulge during World War II
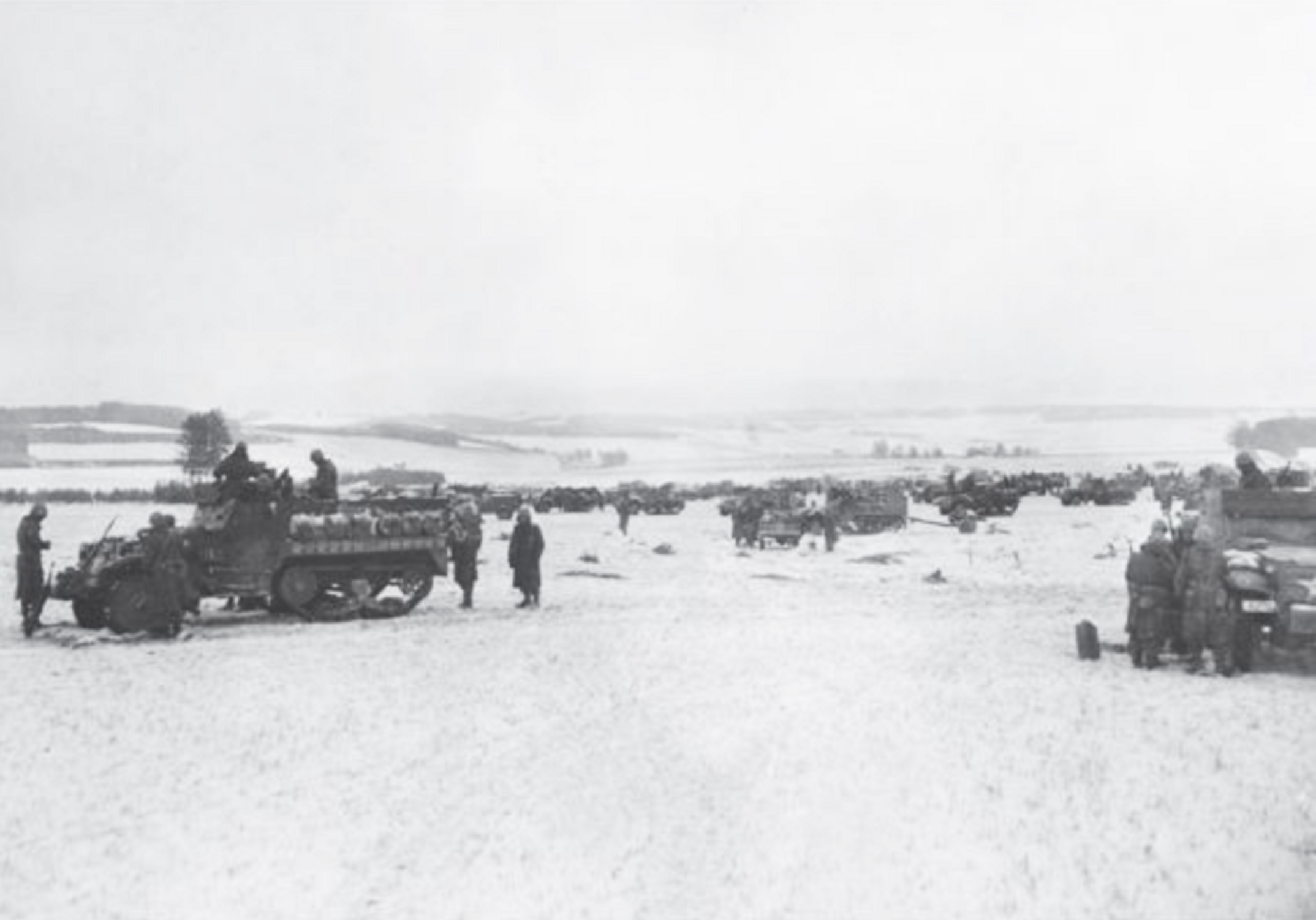
- Half-tracks and soldiers of the 11th Armored Division massed on the outskirts of Bastogne
- Location: 49.992°N 5.618°E; Near Chenogne, Luxembourg, Belgium
- Date: January 1, 1945
- Target: Wehrmacht soldiers of the 3rd Infantry Division and Führerbegleitbrigade
- Attack type: Massacre
- Deaths: ~60 to 80
- Perpetrator: 11th Armored Division (US Army)

The Chenogne massacre was a war crime committed by members of the 11th Armored Division, an American combat unit, near Chenogne, Belgium, on January 1, 1945, during the American counteroffensive at Bastogne, a part of the Battle of the Bulge.

According to eyewitness accounts, an estimated 60 to 80 German prisoners of war were massacred by their American captors; the prisoners were assembled in a field and shot with machine guns. It was one of several war crimes committed during the Battle of the Bulge by members of both Allied and Axis forces.

The events were covered up at the time, and none of the perpetrators were ever punished. Postwar historians believe the killings were carried out on verbal orders by senior commanders that "no prisoners were to be taken".

== Background ==
On December 17, 1944, during the Battle of the Bulge, soldiers from the Waffen-SS gunned down 84 American prisoners at the Baugnez crossroads near the town of Malmedy. Other smaller massacres were also committed against American prisoners and civilians. One German soldier recorded: "Our Sturmführer just shot [prisoners] outright […] There were twelve of them the first time. He just shot them because they were in the way." When news of the killings at Malmedy spread among American forces, it aroused great anger among frontline troops. The 328th Infantry Regiment issued orders that "no SS troops or paratroopers will be taken prisoner but will be shot on sight." Atrocities against Belgian civilians were also witnessed by some American soldiers. A soldier of the 30th Infantry Division recorded: "After we saw those dead civilians in Stavelot, the men changed, [...] They wanted to pulverize everything there was across the river. That wasn't impersonal anger; that was hatred."

The 11th Armored Division was an inexperienced unit that only arrived in Europe on 16 December, 1944. It was then rushed to the front line to help contain the German offensive in the Ardennes. The division participated in the counteroffensive against the German salient and saw heavy action. General George S. Patton recorded that the 11th Armored was "very green and took unnecessary casualties to no effect". Chenogne, a hamlet near the heavily contested town of Bastogne, was the scene of bitter fighting on New Years Day.

At Chenogne, the prisoners of war killed on January 1, 1945, were members of the veteran Führerbegleitbrigade (Führer escort brigade) and 3rd Panzergrenadier Division.

== Eyewitness ==
S/Sgt. John W. Fague of B Company, 21st Armored Infantry Battalion (of the 11th Armored Division), in action near Chenogne, describes the killing of German prisoners by American troops:

Some of the boys had some prisoners line up. I knew they were going to shoot them, and I hated this business.... They marched the prisoners back up the hill to murder them with the rest of the prisoners we had secured that morning.... As we were going up the hill out of town, I know some of our boys were lining up German prisoners in the fields on both sides of the road. There must have been 25 or 30 German boys in each group. Machine guns were being set up. These boys were to be machine gunned and murdered. We were committing the same crimes we were now accusing the Japs and Germans of doing.... Going back down the road into town I looked into the fields where the German boys had been shot. Dark lifeless forms lay in the snow.

Fague's footnotes in the same narrative point out that he had no knowledge of the Malmedy massacre at that time.

== Cover-up ==
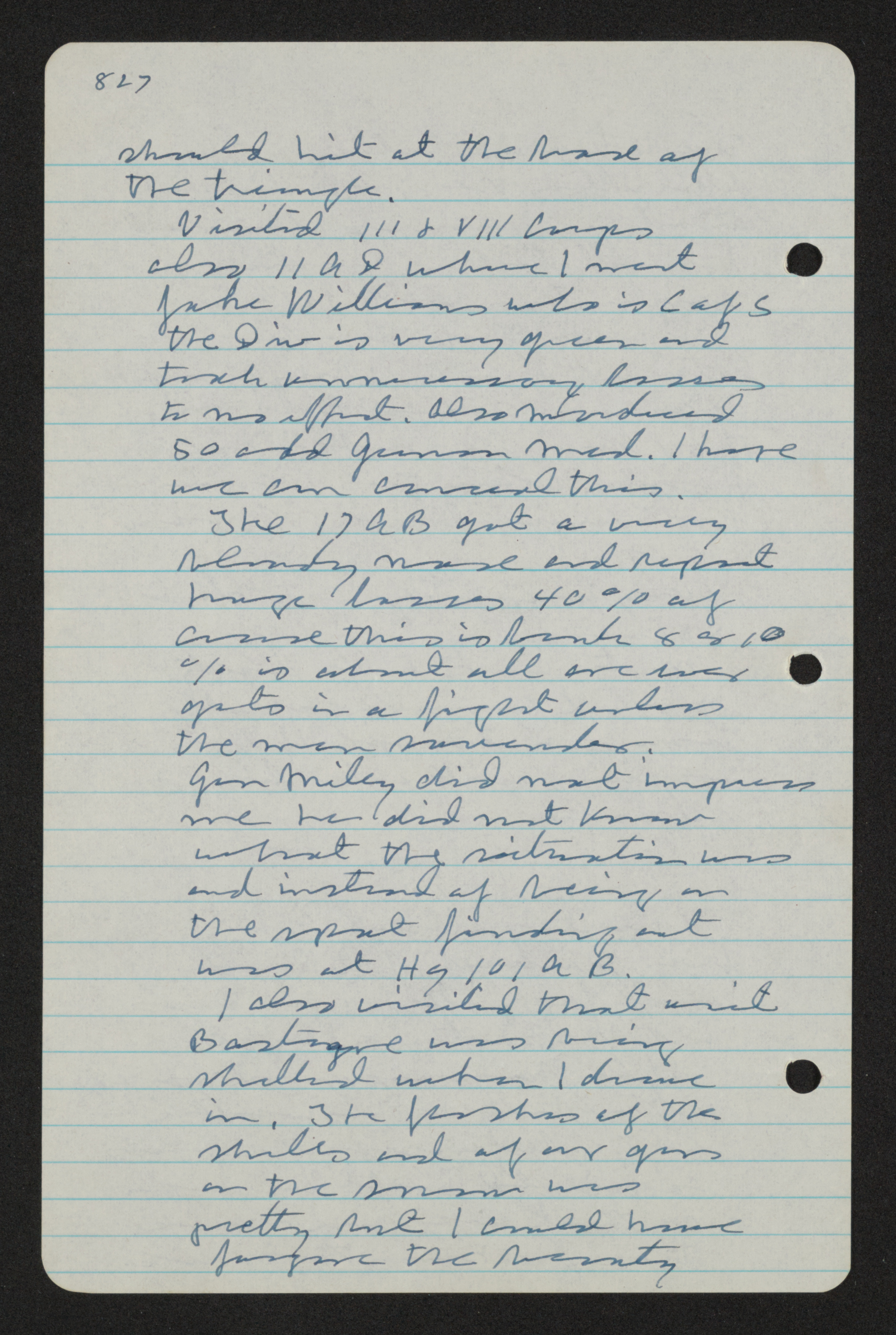
George S. Patton's war diary entry from January 4, 1945. Regarding the Chenogne massacre on January 1, 1945, Patton noted: "Also murdered 50 odd German med [sic]. I hope we can conceal this."

The official postwar history of the Battle of the Bulge published by the United States Army Center of Military History states that while "It is probable that Germans who attempted to surrender in the days immediately after the 17th ran a greater risk" of being killed than earlier in the year, "there is no evidence... that American troops took advantage of orders, implicit or explicit, to kill their SS prisoners." However, according to George Henry Bennett, "The caveat is a little disingenuous", and he notes that it is likely orders given by the U.S. 328th Infantry Regiment to shoot prisoners were carried out, and that other US regiments were likely given similar orders. The killing of SS prisoners had become routine at the time for some units. The 90th Infantry Division at the Saar "executed Waffen-SS prisoners in such a systematic manner late in December 1944 that headquarters had to issue express orders to take Waffen-SS soldiers alive so as to be able to obtain information from them".

In July 2018, KQED-FM radio aired an episode of the Reveal series called "Take No Prisoners: Inside a WWII American War Crime", in which Chris Harland-Dunaway investigated the Chenogne massacre. According to eyewitness reports, US soldiers shot about 80 German soldiers after they had surrendered (roughly one for each American killed in the Malmedy massacre). Harland-Dunaway refers to General George S. Patton's diary in which the latter confirms that the Americans "...also murdered 50 odd German med [sic]. I hope we can conceal this".

According to a declassified file Harland-Dunaway accessed, a soldier named Max Cohen described seeing roughly 70 German prisoners machine-gunned by the 11th Armored Division in Chenogne. Supreme Commander of the Allied Expeditionary Force General Dwight D. Eisenhower demanded a full investigation, but the 11th Armored were uncooperative, saying "it's too late; the war is over, the units are disbanded." Eisenhower never obtained an investigation into those killings in Chenogne. American lawyer Ben Ferencz, who served as a prosecutor at the Nuremberg Tribunal, said after acquainting himself with the declassified report that "It smells to me like a cover-up, of course."

== See also ==
- List of massacres in Belgium
- War crimes in World War II § Crimes perpetrated by the United States
