= Bekkerzeel =

Coordinates: 50°53′07″N 4°14′17″E

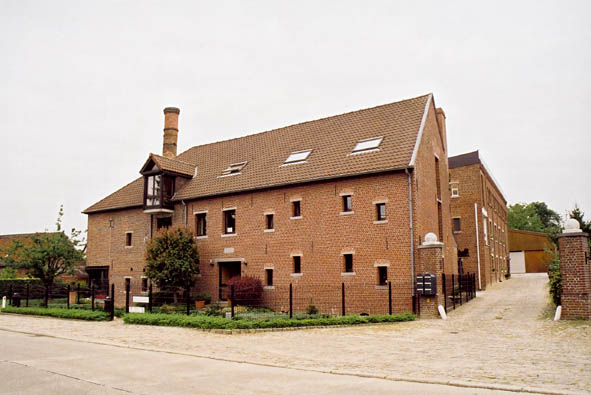
The former Van den Moortel brewery

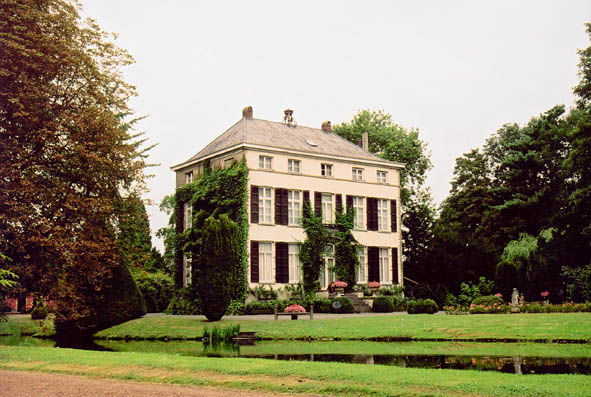
Castle of Bekkerzeel

Bekkerzeel is a submunicipality of Asse in the Belgian province of Flemish Brabant. It was an independent municipality until the municipal reorganization of 1977.

Bekkerzeel was first mentioned in 966. Initially under direct jurisdiction of the Duke of Brabant, the territory of Bekkerzeel was almost completely divided into fiefs of the castle of Groot-Bijgaarden in the 15th-century. One of these was the court ter Zittert, located near the church, which dates back to the primitive court of Bekkerzeel, the basis of the origin and (structural) development of Bekkerzeel.
