= Kobbegem =

Village in Flemish Brabant, Belgium

Coordinates: 50.909961°N 4.250475°E

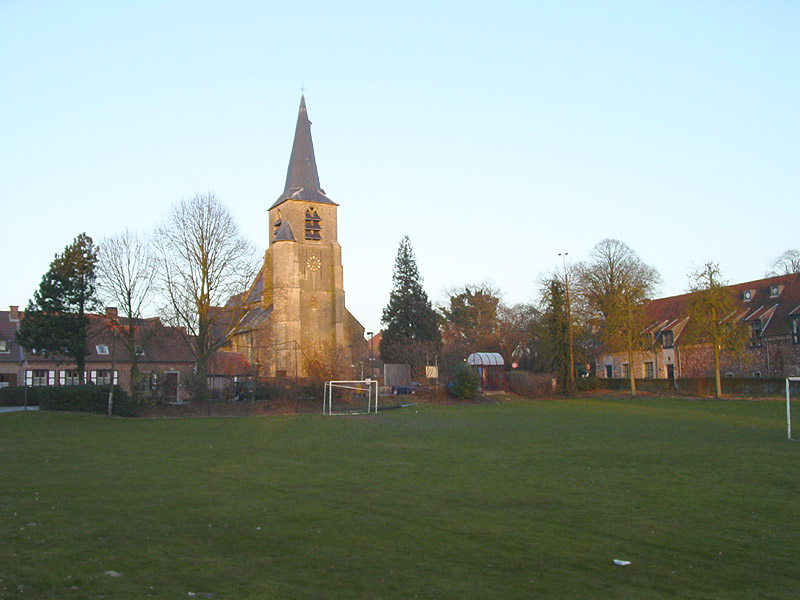
Kobbegem church and village green

Kobbegem is a village that is now part of the municipality of Asse, Flemish Brabant, Belgium.

It was an independent agricultural municipality until 1976. In 1997 it had 805 inhabitants and a brewery.
