= Pieter Dubordieu =

French Baroque painter (1609–1678)

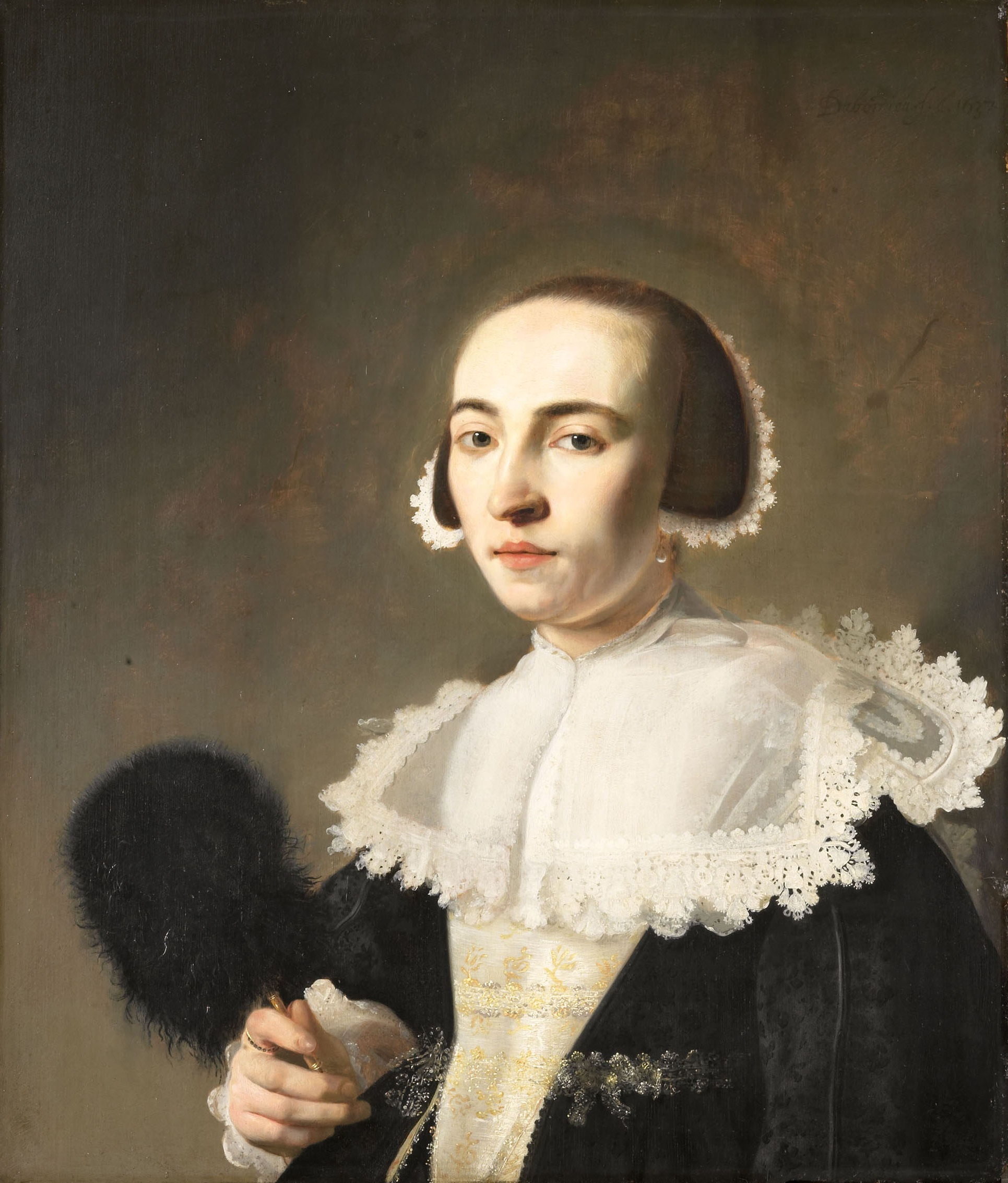
Portrait of a woman, 1637

Pieter Dubordieu (1609 – 1678) was a French Baroque portrait painter in the manner of Michiel Jansz Mierevelt.

== Biography ==
Dubordieu was born in 1609 in the province of Touraine in France.

According to the Netherlands Institute for Art History, or RKD, he worked mostly in Leiden. He was studying there in 1628; in 1636 he was spending time in Amsterdam, but was back in Leiden in 1638. He became a member of the Leiden Guild of St. Luke in 1648, 1651, and during the years 1665–1676. His works are in the style of Mierevelt, but not as richly detailed. Some of his portraits were engraved by Dutch and French engravers.

He died in 1678 in Amsterdam.
