= Chenogne =

Village in Belgium

Coordinates: 49.992°N 5.618°E

Chenogne, Belgium

Chenogne (French pronunciation: [ʃənɔɲ]; Walloon: Dj'none) is a village of Wallonia in the municipality of Vaux-sur-Sûre, district of Sibret, located in the province of Luxembourg, Belgium.

On January 1, 1945, American soldiers are alleged to have massacred German Wehrmacht soldiers during World War II (see the Chenogne massacre) in retaliation to a previous massacre of American soldiers by the Waffen SS.
