= Bogaarden =

Coordinates: 50.73992°N 4.13534°E

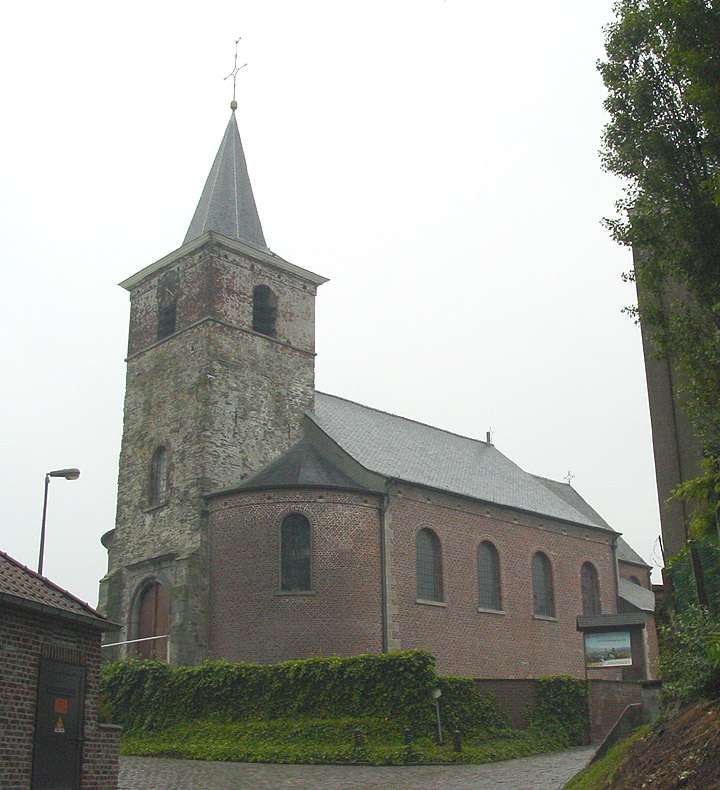
Bogaarden Church

Bogaarden is a village in the municipality of Pepingen, in the Belgian province of Flemish Brabant.

The name 'Bogaarden' means "orchards". Gertrude of Nivelles, daughter of Pippin I, was due to the inherit the property. But when she joined the Abbey of St. Gertrude, all her possessions were donated to the abbey.
